

76001–76100 

|-bgcolor=#d6d6d6
| 76001 ||  || — || February 28, 2000 || Socorro || LINEAR || — || align=right | 6.7 km || 
|-id=002 bgcolor=#d6d6d6
| 76002 ||  || — || February 29, 2000 || Socorro || LINEAR || KOR || align=right | 3.3 km || 
|-id=003 bgcolor=#d6d6d6
| 76003 ||  || — || February 29, 2000 || Socorro || LINEAR || KOR || align=right | 2.8 km || 
|-id=004 bgcolor=#d6d6d6
| 76004 ||  || — || February 29, 2000 || Socorro || LINEAR || KOR || align=right | 3.1 km || 
|-id=005 bgcolor=#d6d6d6
| 76005 ||  || — || February 29, 2000 || Socorro || LINEAR || — || align=right | 6.4 km || 
|-id=006 bgcolor=#fefefe
| 76006 ||  || — || February 29, 2000 || Socorro || LINEAR || — || align=right | 1.8 km || 
|-id=007 bgcolor=#d6d6d6
| 76007 ||  || — || February 29, 2000 || Socorro || LINEAR || KOR || align=right | 2.8 km || 
|-id=008 bgcolor=#E9E9E9
| 76008 ||  || — || February 29, 2000 || Socorro || LINEAR || — || align=right | 2.3 km || 
|-id=009 bgcolor=#d6d6d6
| 76009 ||  || — || February 29, 2000 || Socorro || LINEAR || — || align=right | 3.4 km || 
|-id=010 bgcolor=#d6d6d6
| 76010 ||  || — || February 29, 2000 || Socorro || LINEAR || — || align=right | 6.8 km || 
|-id=011 bgcolor=#E9E9E9
| 76011 ||  || — || February 29, 2000 || Socorro || LINEAR || — || align=right | 3.1 km || 
|-id=012 bgcolor=#E9E9E9
| 76012 ||  || — || February 29, 2000 || Socorro || LINEAR || — || align=right | 2.8 km || 
|-id=013 bgcolor=#E9E9E9
| 76013 ||  || — || February 29, 2000 || Socorro || LINEAR || — || align=right | 4.7 km || 
|-id=014 bgcolor=#d6d6d6
| 76014 ||  || — || February 29, 2000 || Socorro || LINEAR || — || align=right | 5.6 km || 
|-id=015 bgcolor=#d6d6d6
| 76015 ||  || — || February 29, 2000 || Socorro || LINEAR || EOS || align=right | 5.1 km || 
|-id=016 bgcolor=#E9E9E9
| 76016 ||  || — || February 29, 2000 || Socorro || LINEAR || AGN || align=right | 3.0 km || 
|-id=017 bgcolor=#d6d6d6
| 76017 ||  || — || February 29, 2000 || Socorro || LINEAR || HYG || align=right | 6.0 km || 
|-id=018 bgcolor=#d6d6d6
| 76018 ||  || — || February 29, 2000 || Socorro || LINEAR || — || align=right | 6.9 km || 
|-id=019 bgcolor=#d6d6d6
| 76019 ||  || — || February 29, 2000 || Socorro || LINEAR || K-2 || align=right | 2.3 km || 
|-id=020 bgcolor=#E9E9E9
| 76020 ||  || — || February 29, 2000 || Socorro || LINEAR || — || align=right | 3.9 km || 
|-id=021 bgcolor=#d6d6d6
| 76021 ||  || — || February 29, 2000 || Socorro || LINEAR || KOR || align=right | 2.3 km || 
|-id=022 bgcolor=#d6d6d6
| 76022 ||  || — || February 29, 2000 || Socorro || LINEAR || — || align=right | 5.1 km || 
|-id=023 bgcolor=#d6d6d6
| 76023 ||  || — || February 29, 2000 || Socorro || LINEAR || KOR || align=right | 3.7 km || 
|-id=024 bgcolor=#d6d6d6
| 76024 ||  || — || February 29, 2000 || Socorro || LINEAR || THM || align=right | 5.5 km || 
|-id=025 bgcolor=#d6d6d6
| 76025 ||  || — || February 29, 2000 || Socorro || LINEAR || THM || align=right | 4.8 km || 
|-id=026 bgcolor=#d6d6d6
| 76026 ||  || — || February 29, 2000 || Socorro || LINEAR || — || align=right | 7.4 km || 
|-id=027 bgcolor=#E9E9E9
| 76027 ||  || — || February 29, 2000 || Socorro || LINEAR || — || align=right | 4.1 km || 
|-id=028 bgcolor=#E9E9E9
| 76028 ||  || — || February 29, 2000 || Socorro || LINEAR || — || align=right | 2.1 km || 
|-id=029 bgcolor=#d6d6d6
| 76029 ||  || — || February 29, 2000 || Socorro || LINEAR || — || align=right | 6.6 km || 
|-id=030 bgcolor=#E9E9E9
| 76030 ||  || — || February 29, 2000 || Socorro || LINEAR || — || align=right | 2.5 km || 
|-id=031 bgcolor=#d6d6d6
| 76031 ||  || — || February 29, 2000 || Socorro || LINEAR || — || align=right | 5.1 km || 
|-id=032 bgcolor=#d6d6d6
| 76032 ||  || — || February 29, 2000 || Socorro || LINEAR || KOR || align=right | 2.8 km || 
|-id=033 bgcolor=#d6d6d6
| 76033 ||  || — || February 29, 2000 || Socorro || LINEAR || — || align=right | 6.2 km || 
|-id=034 bgcolor=#E9E9E9
| 76034 ||  || — || February 29, 2000 || Socorro || LINEAR || EUN || align=right | 2.2 km || 
|-id=035 bgcolor=#E9E9E9
| 76035 ||  || — || February 29, 2000 || Socorro || LINEAR || — || align=right | 3.9 km || 
|-id=036 bgcolor=#d6d6d6
| 76036 ||  || — || February 29, 2000 || Socorro || LINEAR || — || align=right | 5.8 km || 
|-id=037 bgcolor=#d6d6d6
| 76037 ||  || — || February 29, 2000 || Socorro || LINEAR || — || align=right | 4.6 km || 
|-id=038 bgcolor=#d6d6d6
| 76038 ||  || — || February 29, 2000 || Socorro || LINEAR || EOS || align=right | 5.1 km || 
|-id=039 bgcolor=#E9E9E9
| 76039 ||  || — || February 29, 2000 || Socorro || LINEAR || — || align=right | 2.2 km || 
|-id=040 bgcolor=#d6d6d6
| 76040 ||  || — || February 29, 2000 || Socorro || LINEAR || URS || align=right | 6.4 km || 
|-id=041 bgcolor=#d6d6d6
| 76041 ||  || — || February 29, 2000 || Socorro || LINEAR || — || align=right | 5.9 km || 
|-id=042 bgcolor=#d6d6d6
| 76042 ||  || — || February 29, 2000 || Socorro || LINEAR || CHA || align=right | 5.6 km || 
|-id=043 bgcolor=#d6d6d6
| 76043 ||  || — || February 29, 2000 || Socorro || LINEAR || — || align=right | 6.9 km || 
|-id=044 bgcolor=#E9E9E9
| 76044 ||  || — || February 29, 2000 || Socorro || LINEAR || — || align=right | 5.2 km || 
|-id=045 bgcolor=#E9E9E9
| 76045 ||  || — || February 29, 2000 || Socorro || LINEAR || MAR || align=right | 2.0 km || 
|-id=046 bgcolor=#E9E9E9
| 76046 ||  || — || February 29, 2000 || Socorro || LINEAR || — || align=right | 2.1 km || 
|-id=047 bgcolor=#E9E9E9
| 76047 ||  || — || February 29, 2000 || Socorro || LINEAR || — || align=right | 2.5 km || 
|-id=048 bgcolor=#E9E9E9
| 76048 ||  || — || February 29, 2000 || Socorro || LINEAR || — || align=right | 2.9 km || 
|-id=049 bgcolor=#E9E9E9
| 76049 ||  || — || February 29, 2000 || Socorro || LINEAR || — || align=right | 2.4 km || 
|-id=050 bgcolor=#d6d6d6
| 76050 ||  || — || February 29, 2000 || Socorro || LINEAR || — || align=right | 4.8 km || 
|-id=051 bgcolor=#d6d6d6
| 76051 ||  || — || February 29, 2000 || Socorro || LINEAR || — || align=right | 4.7 km || 
|-id=052 bgcolor=#E9E9E9
| 76052 ||  || — || February 29, 2000 || Socorro || LINEAR || — || align=right | 5.4 km || 
|-id=053 bgcolor=#d6d6d6
| 76053 ||  || — || February 29, 2000 || Socorro || LINEAR || — || align=right | 6.5 km || 
|-id=054 bgcolor=#E9E9E9
| 76054 ||  || — || February 29, 2000 || Socorro || LINEAR || — || align=right | 2.0 km || 
|-id=055 bgcolor=#d6d6d6
| 76055 ||  || — || February 29, 2000 || Socorro || LINEAR || — || align=right | 4.7 km || 
|-id=056 bgcolor=#d6d6d6
| 76056 ||  || — || February 29, 2000 || Socorro || LINEAR || — || align=right | 5.3 km || 
|-id=057 bgcolor=#E9E9E9
| 76057 ||  || — || February 29, 2000 || Socorro || LINEAR || WIT || align=right | 2.7 km || 
|-id=058 bgcolor=#E9E9E9
| 76058 ||  || — || February 29, 2000 || Socorro || LINEAR || — || align=right | 3.6 km || 
|-id=059 bgcolor=#d6d6d6
| 76059 ||  || — || February 29, 2000 || Socorro || LINEAR || HYG || align=right | 6.3 km || 
|-id=060 bgcolor=#E9E9E9
| 76060 ||  || — || February 29, 2000 || Socorro || LINEAR || HEN || align=right | 2.7 km || 
|-id=061 bgcolor=#E9E9E9
| 76061 ||  || — || February 29, 2000 || Socorro || LINEAR || — || align=right | 3.7 km || 
|-id=062 bgcolor=#E9E9E9
| 76062 ||  || — || February 29, 2000 || Socorro || LINEAR || — || align=right | 3.8 km || 
|-id=063 bgcolor=#d6d6d6
| 76063 ||  || — || February 29, 2000 || Socorro || LINEAR || — || align=right | 7.3 km || 
|-id=064 bgcolor=#d6d6d6
| 76064 ||  || — || February 29, 2000 || Socorro || LINEAR || — || align=right | 4.9 km || 
|-id=065 bgcolor=#d6d6d6
| 76065 ||  || — || February 29, 2000 || Socorro || LINEAR || — || align=right | 7.5 km || 
|-id=066 bgcolor=#E9E9E9
| 76066 ||  || — || February 29, 2000 || Socorro || LINEAR || — || align=right | 4.0 km || 
|-id=067 bgcolor=#E9E9E9
| 76067 ||  || — || February 29, 2000 || Socorro || LINEAR || — || align=right | 2.2 km || 
|-id=068 bgcolor=#d6d6d6
| 76068 ||  || — || February 29, 2000 || Socorro || LINEAR || — || align=right | 6.5 km || 
|-id=069 bgcolor=#d6d6d6
| 76069 ||  || — || February 29, 2000 || Socorro || LINEAR || KOR || align=right | 3.4 km || 
|-id=070 bgcolor=#E9E9E9
| 76070 ||  || — || February 29, 2000 || Socorro || LINEAR || — || align=right | 5.8 km || 
|-id=071 bgcolor=#E9E9E9
| 76071 ||  || — || February 28, 2000 || Socorro || LINEAR || — || align=right | 3.5 km || 
|-id=072 bgcolor=#E9E9E9
| 76072 ||  || — || February 28, 2000 || Socorro || LINEAR || — || align=right | 2.6 km || 
|-id=073 bgcolor=#E9E9E9
| 76073 ||  || — || February 28, 2000 || Socorro || LINEAR || AEO || align=right | 5.1 km || 
|-id=074 bgcolor=#E9E9E9
| 76074 ||  || — || February 28, 2000 || Socorro || LINEAR || — || align=right | 1.8 km || 
|-id=075 bgcolor=#E9E9E9
| 76075 ||  || — || February 28, 2000 || Socorro || LINEAR || — || align=right | 2.4 km || 
|-id=076 bgcolor=#E9E9E9
| 76076 ||  || — || February 29, 2000 || Socorro || LINEAR || — || align=right | 4.7 km || 
|-id=077 bgcolor=#d6d6d6
| 76077 ||  || — || February 29, 2000 || Socorro || LINEAR || — || align=right | 6.1 km || 
|-id=078 bgcolor=#E9E9E9
| 76078 ||  || — || February 29, 2000 || Socorro || LINEAR || MRX || align=right | 2.2 km || 
|-id=079 bgcolor=#E9E9E9
| 76079 ||  || — || February 29, 2000 || Socorro || LINEAR || — || align=right | 4.1 km || 
|-id=080 bgcolor=#E9E9E9
| 76080 ||  || — || February 29, 2000 || Socorro || LINEAR || — || align=right | 6.7 km || 
|-id=081 bgcolor=#d6d6d6
| 76081 ||  || — || February 29, 2000 || Socorro || LINEAR || — || align=right | 4.8 km || 
|-id=082 bgcolor=#d6d6d6
| 76082 ||  || — || February 29, 2000 || Socorro || LINEAR || — || align=right | 5.7 km || 
|-id=083 bgcolor=#E9E9E9
| 76083 ||  || — || February 27, 2000 || Kitt Peak || Spacewatch || — || align=right | 1.8 km || 
|-id=084 bgcolor=#d6d6d6
| 76084 ||  || — || February 27, 2000 || Kitt Peak || Spacewatch || — || align=right | 6.8 km || 
|-id=085 bgcolor=#E9E9E9
| 76085 ||  || — || February 27, 2000 || Kitt Peak || Spacewatch || — || align=right | 4.8 km || 
|-id=086 bgcolor=#E9E9E9
| 76086 ||  || — || February 27, 2000 || Kitt Peak || Spacewatch || GEF || align=right | 2.5 km || 
|-id=087 bgcolor=#E9E9E9
| 76087 ||  || — || February 28, 2000 || Socorro || LINEAR || — || align=right | 5.0 km || 
|-id=088 bgcolor=#E9E9E9
| 76088 ||  || — || February 28, 2000 || Socorro || LINEAR || — || align=right | 3.1 km || 
|-id=089 bgcolor=#E9E9E9
| 76089 ||  || — || February 28, 2000 || Socorro || LINEAR || — || align=right | 6.6 km || 
|-id=090 bgcolor=#d6d6d6
| 76090 ||  || — || February 28, 2000 || Socorro || LINEAR || — || align=right | 7.9 km || 
|-id=091 bgcolor=#E9E9E9
| 76091 ||  || — || February 28, 2000 || Socorro || LINEAR || MIT || align=right | 6.1 km || 
|-id=092 bgcolor=#E9E9E9
| 76092 ||  || — || February 28, 2000 || Socorro || LINEAR || — || align=right | 5.1 km || 
|-id=093 bgcolor=#d6d6d6
| 76093 ||  || — || February 29, 2000 || Socorro || LINEAR || — || align=right | 7.4 km || 
|-id=094 bgcolor=#E9E9E9
| 76094 ||  || — || February 29, 2000 || Socorro || LINEAR || — || align=right | 2.6 km || 
|-id=095 bgcolor=#E9E9E9
| 76095 ||  || — || February 29, 2000 || Socorro || LINEAR || — || align=right | 3.8 km || 
|-id=096 bgcolor=#E9E9E9
| 76096 ||  || — || February 29, 2000 || Socorro || LINEAR || — || align=right | 2.7 km || 
|-id=097 bgcolor=#E9E9E9
| 76097 ||  || — || February 29, 2000 || Socorro || LINEAR || — || align=right | 2.9 km || 
|-id=098 bgcolor=#E9E9E9
| 76098 ||  || — || February 29, 2000 || Socorro || LINEAR || — || align=right | 4.6 km || 
|-id=099 bgcolor=#E9E9E9
| 76099 ||  || — || February 29, 2000 || Socorro || LINEAR || — || align=right | 2.2 km || 
|-id=100 bgcolor=#E9E9E9
| 76100 ||  || — || February 29, 2000 || Socorro || LINEAR || — || align=right | 2.7 km || 
|}

76101–76200 

|-bgcolor=#E9E9E9
| 76101 ||  || — || February 29, 2000 || Socorro || LINEAR || — || align=right | 5.2 km || 
|-id=102 bgcolor=#d6d6d6
| 76102 ||  || — || February 29, 2000 || Socorro || LINEAR || EOS || align=right | 4.7 km || 
|-id=103 bgcolor=#E9E9E9
| 76103 ||  || — || February 29, 2000 || Socorro || LINEAR || MAR || align=right | 3.4 km || 
|-id=104 bgcolor=#E9E9E9
| 76104 ||  || — || February 29, 2000 || Socorro || LINEAR || — || align=right | 3.7 km || 
|-id=105 bgcolor=#E9E9E9
| 76105 ||  || — || February 29, 2000 || Socorro || LINEAR || — || align=right | 3.1 km || 
|-id=106 bgcolor=#E9E9E9
| 76106 ||  || — || February 29, 2000 || Socorro || LINEAR || — || align=right | 6.0 km || 
|-id=107 bgcolor=#d6d6d6
| 76107 ||  || — || February 29, 2000 || Socorro || LINEAR || — || align=right | 8.1 km || 
|-id=108 bgcolor=#d6d6d6
| 76108 ||  || — || February 29, 2000 || Socorro || LINEAR || — || align=right | 8.0 km || 
|-id=109 bgcolor=#d6d6d6
| 76109 ||  || — || February 29, 2000 || Socorro || LINEAR || — || align=right | 8.7 km || 
|-id=110 bgcolor=#E9E9E9
| 76110 ||  || — || February 29, 2000 || Socorro || LINEAR || — || align=right | 6.4 km || 
|-id=111 bgcolor=#E9E9E9
| 76111 ||  || — || February 29, 2000 || Socorro || LINEAR || — || align=right | 5.9 km || 
|-id=112 bgcolor=#d6d6d6
| 76112 ||  || — || February 29, 2000 || Socorro || LINEAR || EOS || align=right | 7.8 km || 
|-id=113 bgcolor=#d6d6d6
| 76113 ||  || — || February 29, 2000 || Socorro || LINEAR || — || align=right | 9.0 km || 
|-id=114 bgcolor=#E9E9E9
| 76114 ||  || — || February 29, 2000 || Socorro || LINEAR || — || align=right | 5.1 km || 
|-id=115 bgcolor=#E9E9E9
| 76115 ||  || — || February 28, 2000 || Socorro || LINEAR || — || align=right | 4.7 km || 
|-id=116 bgcolor=#E9E9E9
| 76116 ||  || — || February 29, 2000 || Socorro || LINEAR || — || align=right | 3.5 km || 
|-id=117 bgcolor=#d6d6d6
| 76117 ||  || — || February 26, 2000 || Uccle || T. Pauwels || — || align=right | 6.2 km || 
|-id=118 bgcolor=#E9E9E9
| 76118 ||  || — || February 27, 2000 || Socorro || LINEAR || — || align=right | 4.7 km || 
|-id=119 bgcolor=#d6d6d6
| 76119 ||  || — || February 29, 2000 || Socorro || LINEAR || — || align=right | 6.5 km || 
|-id=120 bgcolor=#d6d6d6
| 76120 ||  || — || February 28, 2000 || Kitt Peak || Spacewatch || KOR || align=right | 2.4 km || 
|-id=121 bgcolor=#E9E9E9
| 76121 ||  || — || February 25, 2000 || Catalina || CSS || — || align=right | 5.1 km || 
|-id=122 bgcolor=#d6d6d6
| 76122 ||  || — || February 25, 2000 || Kitt Peak || Spacewatch || EOS || align=right | 5.3 km || 
|-id=123 bgcolor=#E9E9E9
| 76123 || 2000 EE || — || March 1, 2000 || Oizumi || T. Kobayashi || — || align=right | 3.7 km || 
|-id=124 bgcolor=#E9E9E9
| 76124 ||  || — || March 3, 2000 || Socorro || LINEAR || — || align=right | 4.2 km || 
|-id=125 bgcolor=#E9E9E9
| 76125 ||  || — || March 3, 2000 || Socorro || LINEAR || AGN || align=right | 2.2 km || 
|-id=126 bgcolor=#d6d6d6
| 76126 ||  || — || March 1, 2000 || Catalina || CSS || — || align=right | 6.7 km || 
|-id=127 bgcolor=#d6d6d6
| 76127 ||  || — || March 2, 2000 || Kitt Peak || Spacewatch || — || align=right | 6.2 km || 
|-id=128 bgcolor=#d6d6d6
| 76128 ||  || — || March 2, 2000 || Kitt Peak || Spacewatch || — || align=right | 8.5 km || 
|-id=129 bgcolor=#E9E9E9
| 76129 ||  || — || March 3, 2000 || Socorro || LINEAR || — || align=right | 2.8 km || 
|-id=130 bgcolor=#E9E9E9
| 76130 ||  || — || March 3, 2000 || Socorro || LINEAR || HEN || align=right | 2.9 km || 
|-id=131 bgcolor=#E9E9E9
| 76131 ||  || — || March 3, 2000 || Socorro || LINEAR || — || align=right | 2.7 km || 
|-id=132 bgcolor=#d6d6d6
| 76132 ||  || — || March 3, 2000 || Socorro || LINEAR || TEL || align=right | 2.4 km || 
|-id=133 bgcolor=#E9E9E9
| 76133 ||  || — || March 4, 2000 || Socorro || LINEAR || JUN || align=right | 3.3 km || 
|-id=134 bgcolor=#d6d6d6
| 76134 ||  || — || March 4, 2000 || Socorro || LINEAR || — || align=right | 5.8 km || 
|-id=135 bgcolor=#E9E9E9
| 76135 ||  || — || March 4, 2000 || Socorro || LINEAR || — || align=right | 2.1 km || 
|-id=136 bgcolor=#d6d6d6
| 76136 ||  || — || March 4, 2000 || Socorro || LINEAR || EOS || align=right | 4.3 km || 
|-id=137 bgcolor=#E9E9E9
| 76137 ||  || — || March 4, 2000 || Socorro || LINEAR || — || align=right | 3.0 km || 
|-id=138 bgcolor=#d6d6d6
| 76138 ||  || — || March 4, 2000 || Socorro || LINEAR || — || align=right | 5.4 km || 
|-id=139 bgcolor=#E9E9E9
| 76139 ||  || — || March 4, 2000 || Socorro || LINEAR || RAF || align=right | 2.2 km || 
|-id=140 bgcolor=#d6d6d6
| 76140 ||  || — || March 4, 2000 || Socorro || LINEAR || ALA || align=right | 11 km || 
|-id=141 bgcolor=#E9E9E9
| 76141 ||  || — || March 5, 2000 || Socorro || LINEAR || AGN || align=right | 2.8 km || 
|-id=142 bgcolor=#d6d6d6
| 76142 ||  || — || March 5, 2000 || Socorro || LINEAR || KOR || align=right | 3.4 km || 
|-id=143 bgcolor=#E9E9E9
| 76143 ||  || — || March 5, 2000 || Socorro || LINEAR || — || align=right | 2.8 km || 
|-id=144 bgcolor=#E9E9E9
| 76144 ||  || — || March 5, 2000 || Višnjan Observatory || K. Korlević || AEO || align=right | 3.5 km || 
|-id=145 bgcolor=#d6d6d6
| 76145 ||  || — || March 3, 2000 || Socorro || LINEAR || EOS || align=right | 3.6 km || 
|-id=146 bgcolor=#E9E9E9
| 76146 ||  || — || March 3, 2000 || Socorro || LINEAR || GEF || align=right | 3.5 km || 
|-id=147 bgcolor=#E9E9E9
| 76147 ||  || — || March 3, 2000 || Socorro || LINEAR || — || align=right | 2.9 km || 
|-id=148 bgcolor=#fefefe
| 76148 ||  || — || March 4, 2000 || Socorro || LINEAR || — || align=right | 2.6 km || 
|-id=149 bgcolor=#E9E9E9
| 76149 ||  || — || March 4, 2000 || Socorro || LINEAR || MAR || align=right | 3.6 km || 
|-id=150 bgcolor=#E9E9E9
| 76150 ||  || — || March 4, 2000 || Socorro || LINEAR || — || align=right | 4.5 km || 
|-id=151 bgcolor=#E9E9E9
| 76151 ||  || — || March 7, 2000 || Socorro || LINEAR || — || align=right | 6.5 km || 
|-id=152 bgcolor=#E9E9E9
| 76152 ||  || — || March 3, 2000 || Catalina || CSS || — || align=right | 5.9 km || 
|-id=153 bgcolor=#d6d6d6
| 76153 ||  || — || March 3, 2000 || Catalina || CSS || — || align=right | 10 km || 
|-id=154 bgcolor=#E9E9E9
| 76154 ||  || — || March 3, 2000 || Catalina || CSS || — || align=right | 7.3 km || 
|-id=155 bgcolor=#d6d6d6
| 76155 ||  || — || March 3, 2000 || Catalina || CSS || — || align=right | 7.2 km || 
|-id=156 bgcolor=#E9E9E9
| 76156 ||  || — || March 3, 2000 || Catalina || CSS || MAR || align=right | 2.9 km || 
|-id=157 bgcolor=#E9E9E9
| 76157 ||  || — || March 5, 2000 || Socorro || LINEAR || BRU || align=right | 7.0 km || 
|-id=158 bgcolor=#E9E9E9
| 76158 ||  || — || March 3, 2000 || Kitt Peak || Spacewatch || — || align=right | 2.2 km || 
|-id=159 bgcolor=#d6d6d6
| 76159 ||  || — || March 3, 2000 || Kitt Peak || Spacewatch || — || align=right | 4.3 km || 
|-id=160 bgcolor=#E9E9E9
| 76160 ||  || — || March 8, 2000 || Kitt Peak || Spacewatch || — || align=right | 5.9 km || 
|-id=161 bgcolor=#E9E9E9
| 76161 ||  || — || March 8, 2000 || Kitt Peak || Spacewatch || — || align=right | 2.5 km || 
|-id=162 bgcolor=#E9E9E9
| 76162 ||  || — || March 8, 2000 || Kitt Peak || Spacewatch || — || align=right | 2.1 km || 
|-id=163 bgcolor=#d6d6d6
| 76163 ||  || — || March 3, 2000 || Socorro || LINEAR || EOS || align=right | 8.4 km || 
|-id=164 bgcolor=#d6d6d6
| 76164 ||  || — || March 3, 2000 || Socorro || LINEAR || — || align=right | 3.8 km || 
|-id=165 bgcolor=#d6d6d6
| 76165 ||  || — || March 4, 2000 || Socorro || LINEAR || EOS || align=right | 4.0 km || 
|-id=166 bgcolor=#E9E9E9
| 76166 ||  || — || March 4, 2000 || Socorro || LINEAR || — || align=right | 4.5 km || 
|-id=167 bgcolor=#d6d6d6
| 76167 ||  || — || March 4, 2000 || Socorro || LINEAR || — || align=right | 10 km || 
|-id=168 bgcolor=#E9E9E9
| 76168 ||  || — || March 5, 2000 || Socorro || LINEAR || — || align=right | 4.3 km || 
|-id=169 bgcolor=#E9E9E9
| 76169 ||  || — || March 5, 2000 || Socorro || LINEAR || — || align=right | 4.9 km || 
|-id=170 bgcolor=#E9E9E9
| 76170 ||  || — || March 5, 2000 || Socorro || LINEAR || — || align=right | 5.3 km || 
|-id=171 bgcolor=#E9E9E9
| 76171 ||  || — || March 5, 2000 || Socorro || LINEAR || RAF || align=right | 3.3 km || 
|-id=172 bgcolor=#d6d6d6
| 76172 ||  || — || March 5, 2000 || Socorro || LINEAR || — || align=right | 6.0 km || 
|-id=173 bgcolor=#E9E9E9
| 76173 ||  || — || March 5, 2000 || Socorro || LINEAR || — || align=right | 3.3 km || 
|-id=174 bgcolor=#E9E9E9
| 76174 ||  || — || March 5, 2000 || Socorro || LINEAR || — || align=right | 4.2 km || 
|-id=175 bgcolor=#E9E9E9
| 76175 ||  || — || March 5, 2000 || Socorro || LINEAR || ADE || align=right | 5.2 km || 
|-id=176 bgcolor=#E9E9E9
| 76176 ||  || — || March 8, 2000 || Socorro || LINEAR || HOF || align=right | 5.8 km || 
|-id=177 bgcolor=#E9E9E9
| 76177 ||  || — || March 5, 2000 || Socorro || LINEAR || — || align=right | 3.0 km || 
|-id=178 bgcolor=#E9E9E9
| 76178 ||  || — || March 5, 2000 || Socorro || LINEAR || — || align=right | 5.8 km || 
|-id=179 bgcolor=#E9E9E9
| 76179 ||  || — || March 5, 2000 || Socorro || LINEAR || — || align=right | 6.9 km || 
|-id=180 bgcolor=#E9E9E9
| 76180 ||  || — || March 8, 2000 || Socorro || LINEAR || MAR || align=right | 2.8 km || 
|-id=181 bgcolor=#d6d6d6
| 76181 ||  || — || March 8, 2000 || Socorro || LINEAR || KOR || align=right | 4.1 km || 
|-id=182 bgcolor=#d6d6d6
| 76182 ||  || — || March 8, 2000 || Socorro || LINEAR || EOS || align=right | 4.5 km || 
|-id=183 bgcolor=#E9E9E9
| 76183 ||  || — || March 8, 2000 || Socorro || LINEAR || — || align=right | 3.3 km || 
|-id=184 bgcolor=#d6d6d6
| 76184 ||  || — || March 8, 2000 || Socorro || LINEAR || — || align=right | 3.6 km || 
|-id=185 bgcolor=#d6d6d6
| 76185 ||  || — || March 8, 2000 || Socorro || LINEAR || KOR || align=right | 3.4 km || 
|-id=186 bgcolor=#d6d6d6
| 76186 ||  || — || March 8, 2000 || Socorro || LINEAR || EOS || align=right | 4.4 km || 
|-id=187 bgcolor=#d6d6d6
| 76187 ||  || — || March 8, 2000 || Socorro || LINEAR || KOR || align=right | 4.0 km || 
|-id=188 bgcolor=#d6d6d6
| 76188 ||  || — || March 8, 2000 || Socorro || LINEAR || — || align=right | 3.5 km || 
|-id=189 bgcolor=#d6d6d6
| 76189 ||  || — || March 8, 2000 || Socorro || LINEAR || EOS || align=right | 3.9 km || 
|-id=190 bgcolor=#E9E9E9
| 76190 ||  || — || March 8, 2000 || Socorro || LINEAR || — || align=right | 3.4 km || 
|-id=191 bgcolor=#d6d6d6
| 76191 ||  || — || March 8, 2000 || Socorro || LINEAR || — || align=right | 5.5 km || 
|-id=192 bgcolor=#d6d6d6
| 76192 ||  || — || March 8, 2000 || Socorro || LINEAR || — || align=right | 5.0 km || 
|-id=193 bgcolor=#d6d6d6
| 76193 ||  || — || March 9, 2000 || Socorro || LINEAR || — || align=right | 5.9 km || 
|-id=194 bgcolor=#d6d6d6
| 76194 ||  || — || March 9, 2000 || Socorro || LINEAR || HYG || align=right | 6.6 km || 
|-id=195 bgcolor=#E9E9E9
| 76195 ||  || — || March 9, 2000 || Socorro || LINEAR || EUN || align=right | 3.4 km || 
|-id=196 bgcolor=#d6d6d6
| 76196 ||  || — || March 9, 2000 || Socorro || LINEAR || THM || align=right | 6.0 km || 
|-id=197 bgcolor=#E9E9E9
| 76197 ||  || — || March 9, 2000 || Socorro || LINEAR || — || align=right | 6.9 km || 
|-id=198 bgcolor=#E9E9E9
| 76198 ||  || — || March 9, 2000 || Socorro || LINEAR || — || align=right | 6.1 km || 
|-id=199 bgcolor=#E9E9E9
| 76199 ||  || — || March 9, 2000 || Socorro || LINEAR || — || align=right | 3.1 km || 
|-id=200 bgcolor=#d6d6d6
| 76200 ||  || — || March 10, 2000 || Prescott || P. G. Comba || — || align=right | 11 km || 
|}

76201–76300 

|-bgcolor=#d6d6d6
| 76201 ||  || — || March 8, 2000 || Kitt Peak || Spacewatch || KOR || align=right | 3.5 km || 
|-id=202 bgcolor=#d6d6d6
| 76202 ||  || — || March 8, 2000 || Kitt Peak || Spacewatch || — || align=right | 6.8 km || 
|-id=203 bgcolor=#E9E9E9
| 76203 ||  || — || March 10, 2000 || Kitt Peak || Spacewatch || — || align=right | 3.6 km || 
|-id=204 bgcolor=#d6d6d6
| 76204 ||  || — || March 8, 2000 || Socorro || LINEAR || — || align=right | 7.5 km || 
|-id=205 bgcolor=#E9E9E9
| 76205 ||  || — || March 8, 2000 || Socorro || LINEAR || — || align=right | 7.2 km || 
|-id=206 bgcolor=#d6d6d6
| 76206 ||  || — || March 10, 2000 || Socorro || LINEAR || KOR || align=right | 3.1 km || 
|-id=207 bgcolor=#fefefe
| 76207 ||  || — || March 10, 2000 || Socorro || LINEAR || NYS || align=right | 1.3 km || 
|-id=208 bgcolor=#E9E9E9
| 76208 ||  || — || March 10, 2000 || Socorro || LINEAR || — || align=right | 4.3 km || 
|-id=209 bgcolor=#E9E9E9
| 76209 ||  || — || March 10, 2000 || Socorro || LINEAR || — || align=right | 6.4 km || 
|-id=210 bgcolor=#d6d6d6
| 76210 ||  || — || March 10, 2000 || Socorro || LINEAR || KOR || align=right | 4.4 km || 
|-id=211 bgcolor=#E9E9E9
| 76211 ||  || — || March 10, 2000 || Socorro || LINEAR || — || align=right | 3.9 km || 
|-id=212 bgcolor=#d6d6d6
| 76212 ||  || — || March 10, 2000 || Socorro || LINEAR || THM || align=right | 9.7 km || 
|-id=213 bgcolor=#d6d6d6
| 76213 ||  || — || March 10, 2000 || Socorro || LINEAR || — || align=right | 10 km || 
|-id=214 bgcolor=#E9E9E9
| 76214 ||  || — || March 10, 2000 || Socorro || LINEAR || HNA || align=right | 4.4 km || 
|-id=215 bgcolor=#d6d6d6
| 76215 ||  || — || March 10, 2000 || Socorro || LINEAR || KOR || align=right | 4.2 km || 
|-id=216 bgcolor=#d6d6d6
| 76216 ||  || — || March 10, 2000 || Socorro || LINEAR || KOR || align=right | 3.7 km || 
|-id=217 bgcolor=#E9E9E9
| 76217 ||  || — || March 10, 2000 || Socorro || LINEAR || HOF || align=right | 5.8 km || 
|-id=218 bgcolor=#E9E9E9
| 76218 ||  || — || March 10, 2000 || Socorro || LINEAR || HEN || align=right | 3.4 km || 
|-id=219 bgcolor=#d6d6d6
| 76219 ||  || — || March 10, 2000 || Socorro || LINEAR || — || align=right | 3.6 km || 
|-id=220 bgcolor=#d6d6d6
| 76220 ||  || — || March 10, 2000 || Socorro || LINEAR || — || align=right | 3.8 km || 
|-id=221 bgcolor=#d6d6d6
| 76221 ||  || — || March 10, 2000 || Socorro || LINEAR || — || align=right | 4.4 km || 
|-id=222 bgcolor=#E9E9E9
| 76222 ||  || — || March 10, 2000 || Socorro || LINEAR || — || align=right | 4.4 km || 
|-id=223 bgcolor=#d6d6d6
| 76223 ||  || — || March 10, 2000 || Socorro || LINEAR || KOR || align=right | 3.6 km || 
|-id=224 bgcolor=#E9E9E9
| 76224 ||  || — || March 10, 2000 || Socorro || LINEAR || — || align=right | 5.2 km || 
|-id=225 bgcolor=#d6d6d6
| 76225 ||  || — || March 10, 2000 || Socorro || LINEAR || — || align=right | 11 km || 
|-id=226 bgcolor=#E9E9E9
| 76226 ||  || — || March 10, 2000 || Socorro || LINEAR || — || align=right | 5.1 km || 
|-id=227 bgcolor=#d6d6d6
| 76227 ||  || — || March 9, 2000 || Kitt Peak || Spacewatch || — || align=right | 6.2 km || 
|-id=228 bgcolor=#E9E9E9
| 76228 ||  || — || March 9, 2000 || Socorro || LINEAR || — || align=right | 5.0 km || 
|-id=229 bgcolor=#E9E9E9
| 76229 ||  || — || March 4, 2000 || Fair Oaks Ranch || J. V. McClusky || slow || align=right | 4.4 km || 
|-id=230 bgcolor=#E9E9E9
| 76230 ||  || — || March 4, 2000 || Socorro || LINEAR || DOR || align=right | 6.8 km || 
|-id=231 bgcolor=#E9E9E9
| 76231 ||  || — || March 5, 2000 || Socorro || LINEAR || — || align=right | 5.1 km || 
|-id=232 bgcolor=#d6d6d6
| 76232 ||  || — || March 5, 2000 || Socorro || LINEAR || KOR || align=right | 3.8 km || 
|-id=233 bgcolor=#d6d6d6
| 76233 ||  || — || March 5, 2000 || Socorro || LINEAR || KOR || align=right | 4.4 km || 
|-id=234 bgcolor=#d6d6d6
| 76234 ||  || — || March 5, 2000 || Socorro || LINEAR || KOR || align=right | 3.7 km || 
|-id=235 bgcolor=#E9E9E9
| 76235 ||  || — || March 5, 2000 || Socorro || LINEAR || DOR || align=right | 6.9 km || 
|-id=236 bgcolor=#E9E9E9
| 76236 ||  || — || March 5, 2000 || Socorro || LINEAR || ADE || align=right | 4.4 km || 
|-id=237 bgcolor=#E9E9E9
| 76237 ||  || — || March 5, 2000 || Socorro || LINEAR || — || align=right | 3.4 km || 
|-id=238 bgcolor=#E9E9E9
| 76238 ||  || — || March 5, 2000 || Socorro || LINEAR || — || align=right | 6.0 km || 
|-id=239 bgcolor=#d6d6d6
| 76239 ||  || — || March 5, 2000 || Socorro || LINEAR || EOS || align=right | 4.5 km || 
|-id=240 bgcolor=#E9E9E9
| 76240 ||  || — || March 5, 2000 || Socorro || LINEAR || — || align=right | 4.4 km || 
|-id=241 bgcolor=#d6d6d6
| 76241 ||  || — || March 5, 2000 || Socorro || LINEAR || — || align=right | 4.5 km || 
|-id=242 bgcolor=#E9E9E9
| 76242 ||  || — || March 5, 2000 || Socorro || LINEAR || — || align=right | 2.6 km || 
|-id=243 bgcolor=#E9E9E9
| 76243 ||  || — || March 8, 2000 || Socorro || LINEAR || — || align=right | 2.2 km || 
|-id=244 bgcolor=#E9E9E9
| 76244 ||  || — || March 8, 2000 || Socorro || LINEAR || AGN || align=right | 3.8 km || 
|-id=245 bgcolor=#d6d6d6
| 76245 ||  || — || March 8, 2000 || Socorro || LINEAR || TIR || align=right | 7.3 km || 
|-id=246 bgcolor=#E9E9E9
| 76246 ||  || — || March 8, 2000 || Socorro || LINEAR || — || align=right | 3.9 km || 
|-id=247 bgcolor=#E9E9E9
| 76247 ||  || — || March 8, 2000 || Socorro || LINEAR || — || align=right | 7.6 km || 
|-id=248 bgcolor=#E9E9E9
| 76248 ||  || — || March 8, 2000 || Socorro || LINEAR || EUN || align=right | 3.3 km || 
|-id=249 bgcolor=#E9E9E9
| 76249 ||  || — || March 8, 2000 || Socorro || LINEAR || — || align=right | 4.1 km || 
|-id=250 bgcolor=#E9E9E9
| 76250 ||  || — || March 9, 2000 || Socorro || LINEAR || — || align=right | 2.9 km || 
|-id=251 bgcolor=#d6d6d6
| 76251 ||  || — || March 9, 2000 || Socorro || LINEAR || — || align=right | 8.7 km || 
|-id=252 bgcolor=#d6d6d6
| 76252 ||  || — || March 9, 2000 || Socorro || LINEAR || — || align=right | 11 km || 
|-id=253 bgcolor=#E9E9E9
| 76253 ||  || — || March 9, 2000 || Socorro || LINEAR || — || align=right | 6.3 km || 
|-id=254 bgcolor=#d6d6d6
| 76254 ||  || — || March 9, 2000 || Socorro || LINEAR || — || align=right | 7.9 km || 
|-id=255 bgcolor=#E9E9E9
| 76255 ||  || — || March 9, 2000 || Socorro || LINEAR || — || align=right | 2.7 km || 
|-id=256 bgcolor=#E9E9E9
| 76256 ||  || — || March 9, 2000 || Socorro || LINEAR || — || align=right | 4.0 km || 
|-id=257 bgcolor=#E9E9E9
| 76257 ||  || — || March 10, 2000 || Socorro || LINEAR || — || align=right | 4.5 km || 
|-id=258 bgcolor=#d6d6d6
| 76258 ||  || — || March 10, 2000 || Kitt Peak || Spacewatch || EOS || align=right | 3.7 km || 
|-id=259 bgcolor=#d6d6d6
| 76259 ||  || — || March 12, 2000 || Kitt Peak || Spacewatch || — || align=right | 5.3 km || 
|-id=260 bgcolor=#d6d6d6
| 76260 ||  || — || March 14, 2000 || Kitt Peak || Spacewatch || KOR || align=right | 3.5 km || 
|-id=261 bgcolor=#E9E9E9
| 76261 ||  || — || March 12, 2000 || Socorro || LINEAR || — || align=right | 4.5 km || 
|-id=262 bgcolor=#E9E9E9
| 76262 ||  || — || March 14, 2000 || Socorro || LINEAR || — || align=right | 5.5 km || 
|-id=263 bgcolor=#d6d6d6
| 76263 ||  || — || March 11, 2000 || Anderson Mesa || LONEOS || — || align=right | 4.8 km || 
|-id=264 bgcolor=#E9E9E9
| 76264 ||  || — || March 11, 2000 || Anderson Mesa || LONEOS || GEF || align=right | 2.9 km || 
|-id=265 bgcolor=#E9E9E9
| 76265 ||  || — || March 11, 2000 || Anderson Mesa || LONEOS || — || align=right | 5.1 km || 
|-id=266 bgcolor=#d6d6d6
| 76266 ||  || — || March 11, 2000 || Anderson Mesa || LONEOS || — || align=right | 11 km || 
|-id=267 bgcolor=#d6d6d6
| 76267 ||  || — || March 11, 2000 || Anderson Mesa || LONEOS || — || align=right | 7.9 km || 
|-id=268 bgcolor=#E9E9E9
| 76268 ||  || — || March 11, 2000 || Anderson Mesa || LONEOS || — || align=right | 5.9 km || 
|-id=269 bgcolor=#E9E9E9
| 76269 ||  || — || March 8, 2000 || Socorro || LINEAR || MAR || align=right | 2.8 km || 
|-id=270 bgcolor=#fefefe
| 76270 ||  || — || March 8, 2000 || Haleakala || NEAT || V || align=right | 2.7 km || 
|-id=271 bgcolor=#d6d6d6
| 76271 ||  || — || March 8, 2000 || Haleakala || NEAT || EOS || align=right | 4.7 km || 
|-id=272 bgcolor=#E9E9E9
| 76272 De Jong ||  ||  || March 8, 2000 || Haleakala || NEAT || CLOslow || align=right | 5.4 km || 
|-id=273 bgcolor=#d6d6d6
| 76273 ||  || — || March 9, 2000 || Socorro || LINEAR || EOS || align=right | 3.8 km || 
|-id=274 bgcolor=#d6d6d6
| 76274 ||  || — || March 9, 2000 || Socorro || LINEAR || — || align=right | 4.9 km || 
|-id=275 bgcolor=#d6d6d6
| 76275 ||  || — || March 9, 2000 || Socorro || LINEAR || — || align=right | 3.7 km || 
|-id=276 bgcolor=#d6d6d6
| 76276 ||  || — || March 9, 2000 || Kvistaberg || UDAS || EOS || align=right | 5.1 km || 
|-id=277 bgcolor=#E9E9E9
| 76277 ||  || — || March 9, 2000 || Kvistaberg || UDAS || — || align=right | 7.1 km || 
|-id=278 bgcolor=#d6d6d6
| 76278 ||  || — || March 10, 2000 || Kitt Peak || Spacewatch || VER || align=right | 7.2 km || 
|-id=279 bgcolor=#d6d6d6
| 76279 ||  || — || March 10, 2000 || Socorro || LINEAR || KOR || align=right | 3.9 km || 
|-id=280 bgcolor=#E9E9E9
| 76280 ||  || — || March 11, 2000 || Anderson Mesa || LONEOS || — || align=right | 3.3 km || 
|-id=281 bgcolor=#E9E9E9
| 76281 ||  || — || March 11, 2000 || Anderson Mesa || LONEOS || — || align=right | 3.4 km || 
|-id=282 bgcolor=#E9E9E9
| 76282 ||  || — || March 11, 2000 || Anderson Mesa || LONEOS || — || align=right | 3.7 km || 
|-id=283 bgcolor=#d6d6d6
| 76283 ||  || — || March 11, 2000 || Anderson Mesa || LONEOS || — || align=right | 4.3 km || 
|-id=284 bgcolor=#E9E9E9
| 76284 ||  || — || March 11, 2000 || Anderson Mesa || LONEOS || — || align=right | 2.0 km || 
|-id=285 bgcolor=#E9E9E9
| 76285 ||  || — || March 11, 2000 || Anderson Mesa || LONEOS || — || align=right | 4.4 km || 
|-id=286 bgcolor=#E9E9E9
| 76286 ||  || — || March 11, 2000 || Anderson Mesa || LONEOS || — || align=right | 6.0 km || 
|-id=287 bgcolor=#E9E9E9
| 76287 ||  || — || March 11, 2000 || Catalina || CSS || MAR || align=right | 2.3 km || 
|-id=288 bgcolor=#d6d6d6
| 76288 ||  || — || March 11, 2000 || Anderson Mesa || LONEOS || KOR || align=right | 3.9 km || 
|-id=289 bgcolor=#E9E9E9
| 76289 ||  || — || March 11, 2000 || Anderson Mesa || LONEOS || — || align=right | 5.2 km || 
|-id=290 bgcolor=#E9E9E9
| 76290 ||  || — || March 11, 2000 || Anderson Mesa || LONEOS || — || align=right | 5.1 km || 
|-id=291 bgcolor=#E9E9E9
| 76291 ||  || — || March 11, 2000 || Anderson Mesa || LONEOS || — || align=right | 6.2 km || 
|-id=292 bgcolor=#d6d6d6
| 76292 ||  || — || March 11, 2000 || Anderson Mesa || LONEOS || — || align=right | 9.6 km || 
|-id=293 bgcolor=#E9E9E9
| 76293 ||  || — || March 11, 2000 || Anderson Mesa || LONEOS || EUN || align=right | 3.9 km || 
|-id=294 bgcolor=#d6d6d6
| 76294 ||  || — || March 11, 2000 || Anderson Mesa || LONEOS || — || align=right | 6.1 km || 
|-id=295 bgcolor=#E9E9E9
| 76295 ||  || — || March 11, 2000 || Anderson Mesa || LONEOS || — || align=right | 5.8 km || 
|-id=296 bgcolor=#d6d6d6
| 76296 ||  || — || March 11, 2000 || Anderson Mesa || LONEOS || — || align=right | 8.1 km || 
|-id=297 bgcolor=#d6d6d6
| 76297 ||  || — || March 11, 2000 || Anderson Mesa || LONEOS || — || align=right | 7.0 km || 
|-id=298 bgcolor=#d6d6d6
| 76298 ||  || — || March 11, 2000 || Anderson Mesa || LONEOS || EOS || align=right | 4.2 km || 
|-id=299 bgcolor=#d6d6d6
| 76299 ||  || — || March 11, 2000 || Socorro || LINEAR || EOS || align=right | 3.8 km || 
|-id=300 bgcolor=#d6d6d6
| 76300 ||  || — || March 11, 2000 || Socorro || LINEAR || — || align=right | 5.6 km || 
|}

76301–76400 

|-bgcolor=#d6d6d6
| 76301 ||  || — || March 11, 2000 || Socorro || LINEAR || KOR || align=right | 3.3 km || 
|-id=302 bgcolor=#d6d6d6
| 76302 ||  || — || March 11, 2000 || Anderson Mesa || LONEOS || — || align=right | 7.0 km || 
|-id=303 bgcolor=#d6d6d6
| 76303 ||  || — || March 11, 2000 || Anderson Mesa || LONEOS || — || align=right | 8.2 km || 
|-id=304 bgcolor=#E9E9E9
| 76304 ||  || — || March 11, 2000 || Anderson Mesa || LONEOS || EUN || align=right | 5.0 km || 
|-id=305 bgcolor=#E9E9E9
| 76305 ||  || — || March 11, 2000 || Anderson Mesa || LONEOS || — || align=right | 3.9 km || 
|-id=306 bgcolor=#d6d6d6
| 76306 ||  || — || March 12, 2000 || Socorro || LINEAR || — || align=right | 2.5 km || 
|-id=307 bgcolor=#d6d6d6
| 76307 ||  || — || March 7, 2000 || Socorro || LINEAR || EOS || align=right | 6.9 km || 
|-id=308 bgcolor=#E9E9E9
| 76308 ||  || — || March 7, 2000 || Socorro || LINEAR || EUN || align=right | 3.9 km || 
|-id=309 bgcolor=#E9E9E9
| 76309 Ronferdie ||  ||  || March 10, 2000 || Catalina || R. Hill || MAR || align=right | 4.6 km || 
|-id=310 bgcolor=#E9E9E9
| 76310 ||  || — || March 11, 2000 || Catalina || CSS || — || align=right | 4.1 km || 
|-id=311 bgcolor=#E9E9E9
| 76311 ||  || — || March 11, 2000 || Catalina || CSS || — || align=right | 3.5 km || 
|-id=312 bgcolor=#d6d6d6
| 76312 ||  || — || March 11, 2000 || Catalina || CSS || ALA || align=right | 14 km || 
|-id=313 bgcolor=#d6d6d6
| 76313 ||  || — || March 11, 2000 || Catalina || CSS || — || align=right | 4.7 km || 
|-id=314 bgcolor=#E9E9E9
| 76314 ||  || — || March 11, 2000 || Catalina || CSS || — || align=right | 5.1 km || 
|-id=315 bgcolor=#E9E9E9
| 76315 ||  || — || March 11, 2000 || Catalina || CSS || — || align=right | 5.0 km || 
|-id=316 bgcolor=#E9E9E9
| 76316 ||  || — || March 2, 2000 || Catalina || CSS || — || align=right | 2.6 km || 
|-id=317 bgcolor=#E9E9E9
| 76317 ||  || — || March 2, 2000 || Catalina || CSS || — || align=right | 3.1 km || 
|-id=318 bgcolor=#d6d6d6
| 76318 ||  || — || March 2, 2000 || Catalina || CSS || URS || align=right | 12 km || 
|-id=319 bgcolor=#E9E9E9
| 76319 ||  || — || March 3, 2000 || Catalina || CSS || EUN || align=right | 2.9 km || 
|-id=320 bgcolor=#E9E9E9
| 76320 ||  || — || March 3, 2000 || Catalina || CSS || ADE || align=right | 7.0 km || 
|-id=321 bgcolor=#E9E9E9
| 76321 ||  || — || March 3, 2000 || Catalina || CSS || — || align=right | 4.4 km || 
|-id=322 bgcolor=#E9E9E9
| 76322 ||  || — || March 3, 2000 || Catalina || CSS || — || align=right | 4.4 km || 
|-id=323 bgcolor=#E9E9E9
| 76323 ||  || — || March 3, 2000 || Socorro || LINEAR || — || align=right | 3.3 km || 
|-id=324 bgcolor=#d6d6d6
| 76324 ||  || — || March 4, 2000 || Socorro || LINEAR || — || align=right | 6.8 km || 
|-id=325 bgcolor=#E9E9E9
| 76325 ||  || — || March 4, 2000 || Catalina || CSS || — || align=right | 3.0 km || 
|-id=326 bgcolor=#E9E9E9
| 76326 ||  || — || March 4, 2000 || Socorro || LINEAR || — || align=right | 3.3 km || 
|-id=327 bgcolor=#E9E9E9
| 76327 ||  || — || March 4, 2000 || Catalina || CSS || MAR || align=right | 5.2 km || 
|-id=328 bgcolor=#E9E9E9
| 76328 ||  || — || March 4, 2000 || Catalina || CSS || — || align=right | 6.0 km || 
|-id=329 bgcolor=#E9E9E9
| 76329 ||  || — || March 4, 2000 || Catalina || CSS || EUN || align=right | 3.1 km || 
|-id=330 bgcolor=#E9E9E9
| 76330 ||  || — || March 4, 2000 || Catalina || CSS || — || align=right | 3.3 km || 
|-id=331 bgcolor=#d6d6d6
| 76331 ||  || — || March 5, 2000 || Socorro || LINEAR || HYG || align=right | 6.9 km || 
|-id=332 bgcolor=#E9E9E9
| 76332 ||  || — || March 5, 2000 || Socorro || LINEAR || — || align=right | 4.0 km || 
|-id=333 bgcolor=#E9E9E9
| 76333 ||  || — || March 5, 2000 || Socorro || LINEAR || — || align=right | 3.5 km || 
|-id=334 bgcolor=#E9E9E9
| 76334 ||  || — || March 5, 2000 || Haleakala || NEAT || — || align=right | 4.5 km || 
|-id=335 bgcolor=#E9E9E9
| 76335 ||  || — || March 5, 2000 || Haleakala || NEAT || PAD || align=right | 4.7 km || 
|-id=336 bgcolor=#E9E9E9
| 76336 ||  || — || March 6, 2000 || Haleakala || NEAT || GER || align=right | 3.9 km || 
|-id=337 bgcolor=#d6d6d6
| 76337 ||  || — || March 6, 2000 || Haleakala || NEAT || EOS || align=right | 3.9 km || 
|-id=338 bgcolor=#d6d6d6
| 76338 ||  || — || March 6, 2000 || Haleakala || NEAT || — || align=right | 5.4 km || 
|-id=339 bgcolor=#E9E9E9
| 76339 ||  || — || March 6, 2000 || Haleakala || NEAT || — || align=right | 4.2 km || 
|-id=340 bgcolor=#d6d6d6
| 76340 ||  || — || March 9, 2000 || Socorro || LINEAR || — || align=right | 9.1 km || 
|-id=341 bgcolor=#E9E9E9
| 76341 ||  || — || March 9, 2000 || Socorro || LINEAR || — || align=right | 6.5 km || 
|-id=342 bgcolor=#E9E9E9
| 76342 ||  || — || March 11, 2000 || Catalina || CSS || EUN || align=right | 2.5 km || 
|-id=343 bgcolor=#E9E9E9
| 76343 ||  || — || March 11, 2000 || Catalina || CSS || MAR || align=right | 2.2 km || 
|-id=344 bgcolor=#E9E9E9
| 76344 ||  || — || March 11, 2000 || Catalina || CSS || MAR || align=right | 2.9 km || 
|-id=345 bgcolor=#E9E9E9
| 76345 ||  || — || March 12, 2000 || Anderson Mesa || LONEOS || — || align=right | 4.1 km || 
|-id=346 bgcolor=#d6d6d6
| 76346 ||  || — || March 12, 2000 || Anderson Mesa || LONEOS || EOS || align=right | 4.8 km || 
|-id=347 bgcolor=#d6d6d6
| 76347 ||  || — || March 12, 2000 || Anderson Mesa || LONEOS || EOS || align=right | 7.5 km || 
|-id=348 bgcolor=#E9E9E9
| 76348 ||  || — || March 3, 2000 || Socorro || LINEAR || — || align=right | 3.8 km || 
|-id=349 bgcolor=#E9E9E9
| 76349 ||  || — || March 3, 2000 || Socorro || LINEAR || — || align=right | 4.1 km || 
|-id=350 bgcolor=#E9E9E9
| 76350 ||  || — || March 3, 2000 || Socorro || LINEAR || HEN || align=right | 1.8 km || 
|-id=351 bgcolor=#E9E9E9
| 76351 ||  || — || March 3, 2000 || Socorro || LINEAR || — || align=right | 4.0 km || 
|-id=352 bgcolor=#E9E9E9
| 76352 ||  || — || March 3, 2000 || Socorro || LINEAR || NEM || align=right | 6.5 km || 
|-id=353 bgcolor=#d6d6d6
| 76353 ||  || — || March 3, 2000 || Socorro || LINEAR || THM || align=right | 6.2 km || 
|-id=354 bgcolor=#E9E9E9
| 76354 ||  || — || March 4, 2000 || Socorro || LINEAR || RAF || align=right | 1.7 km || 
|-id=355 bgcolor=#E9E9E9
| 76355 ||  || — || March 4, 2000 || Socorro || LINEAR || — || align=right | 5.6 km || 
|-id=356 bgcolor=#d6d6d6
| 76356 ||  || — || March 4, 2000 || Socorro || LINEAR || — || align=right | 5.5 km || 
|-id=357 bgcolor=#E9E9E9
| 76357 ||  || — || March 4, 2000 || Socorro || LINEAR || EUN || align=right | 2.5 km || 
|-id=358 bgcolor=#d6d6d6
| 76358 ||  || — || March 4, 2000 || Socorro || LINEAR || — || align=right | 13 km || 
|-id=359 bgcolor=#d6d6d6
| 76359 ||  || — || March 4, 2000 || Socorro || LINEAR || — || align=right | 7.7 km || 
|-id=360 bgcolor=#E9E9E9
| 76360 ||  || — || March 5, 2000 || Socorro || LINEAR || DOR || align=right | 7.7 km || 
|-id=361 bgcolor=#fefefe
| 76361 ||  || — || March 5, 2000 || Socorro || LINEAR || — || align=right | 2.7 km || 
|-id=362 bgcolor=#E9E9E9
| 76362 ||  || — || March 5, 2000 || Socorro || LINEAR || — || align=right | 6.2 km || 
|-id=363 bgcolor=#E9E9E9
| 76363 ||  || — || March 4, 2000 || Socorro || LINEAR || — || align=right | 3.8 km || 
|-id=364 bgcolor=#E9E9E9
| 76364 ||  || — || March 4, 2000 || Socorro || LINEAR || MIT || align=right | 6.2 km || 
|-id=365 bgcolor=#d6d6d6
| 76365 ||  || — || March 4, 2000 || Socorro || LINEAR || URS || align=right | 11 km || 
|-id=366 bgcolor=#E9E9E9
| 76366 ||  || — || March 4, 2000 || Socorro || LINEAR || — || align=right | 4.0 km || 
|-id=367 bgcolor=#E9E9E9
| 76367 ||  || — || March 4, 2000 || Socorro || LINEAR || — || align=right | 3.4 km || 
|-id=368 bgcolor=#d6d6d6
| 76368 ||  || — || March 6, 2000 || Haleakala || NEAT || — || align=right | 7.6 km || 
|-id=369 bgcolor=#E9E9E9
| 76369 ||  || — || March 3, 2000 || Catalina || CSS || — || align=right | 2.8 km || 
|-id=370 bgcolor=#d6d6d6
| 76370 ||  || — || March 4, 2000 || Socorro || LINEAR || EOS || align=right | 5.8 km || 
|-id=371 bgcolor=#E9E9E9
| 76371 ||  || — || March 4, 2000 || Socorro || LINEAR || — || align=right | 2.3 km || 
|-id=372 bgcolor=#E9E9E9
| 76372 ||  || — || March 4, 2000 || Socorro || LINEAR || — || align=right | 3.2 km || 
|-id=373 bgcolor=#E9E9E9
| 76373 ||  || — || March 4, 2000 || Socorro || LINEAR || — || align=right | 5.9 km || 
|-id=374 bgcolor=#d6d6d6
| 76374 ||  || — || March 5, 2000 || Socorro || LINEAR || — || align=right | 4.7 km || 
|-id=375 bgcolor=#d6d6d6
| 76375 ||  || — || March 5, 2000 || Socorro || LINEAR || — || align=right | 6.3 km || 
|-id=376 bgcolor=#d6d6d6
| 76376 ||  || — || March 5, 2000 || Socorro || LINEAR || — || align=right | 3.8 km || 
|-id=377 bgcolor=#d6d6d6
| 76377 ||  || — || March 5, 2000 || Socorro || LINEAR || EOS || align=right | 4.7 km || 
|-id=378 bgcolor=#E9E9E9
| 76378 ||  || — || March 5, 2000 || Socorro || LINEAR || BRG || align=right | 3.4 km || 
|-id=379 bgcolor=#d6d6d6
| 76379 ||  || — || March 3, 2000 || Socorro || LINEAR || — || align=right | 5.5 km || 
|-id=380 bgcolor=#E9E9E9
| 76380 ||  || — || March 4, 2000 || Socorro || LINEAR || EUN || align=right | 2.5 km || 
|-id=381 bgcolor=#d6d6d6
| 76381 ||  || — || March 1, 2000 || Catalina || CSS || EOS || align=right | 5.1 km || 
|-id=382 bgcolor=#d6d6d6
| 76382 ||  || — || March 1, 2000 || Catalina || CSS || EOS || align=right | 6.8 km || 
|-id=383 bgcolor=#E9E9E9
| 76383 ||  || — || March 1, 2000 || Catalina || CSS || GEF || align=right | 3.9 km || 
|-id=384 bgcolor=#d6d6d6
| 76384 || 2000 FE || — || March 24, 2000 || Farpoint || Farpoint Obs. || — || align=right | 8.1 km || 
|-id=385 bgcolor=#E9E9E9
| 76385 ||  || — || March 28, 2000 || Socorro || LINEAR || — || align=right | 2.5 km || 
|-id=386 bgcolor=#E9E9E9
| 76386 ||  || — || March 28, 2000 || Socorro || LINEAR || — || align=right | 3.6 km || 
|-id=387 bgcolor=#E9E9E9
| 76387 ||  || — || March 25, 2000 || Kitt Peak || Spacewatch || — || align=right | 5.3 km || 
|-id=388 bgcolor=#d6d6d6
| 76388 ||  || — || March 25, 2000 || Kitt Peak || Spacewatch || THM || align=right | 5.0 km || 
|-id=389 bgcolor=#E9E9E9
| 76389 ||  || — || March 25, 2000 || Kitt Peak || Spacewatch || — || align=right | 5.4 km || 
|-id=390 bgcolor=#d6d6d6
| 76390 ||  || — || March 27, 2000 || Kitt Peak || Spacewatch || HYG || align=right | 4.4 km || 
|-id=391 bgcolor=#d6d6d6
| 76391 ||  || — || March 28, 2000 || Kvistaberg || UDAS || — || align=right | 7.4 km || 
|-id=392 bgcolor=#E9E9E9
| 76392 ||  || — || March 28, 2000 || Socorro || LINEAR || — || align=right | 5.5 km || 
|-id=393 bgcolor=#E9E9E9
| 76393 ||  || — || March 28, 2000 || Socorro || LINEAR || — || align=right | 3.6 km || 
|-id=394 bgcolor=#E9E9E9
| 76394 ||  || — || March 28, 2000 || Socorro || LINEAR || WAT || align=right | 5.3 km || 
|-id=395 bgcolor=#d6d6d6
| 76395 ||  || — || March 28, 2000 || Socorro || LINEAR || EOS || align=right | 5.3 km || 
|-id=396 bgcolor=#d6d6d6
| 76396 ||  || — || March 28, 2000 || Socorro || LINEAR || — || align=right | 7.3 km || 
|-id=397 bgcolor=#E9E9E9
| 76397 ||  || — || March 28, 2000 || Socorro || LINEAR || ADE || align=right | 6.3 km || 
|-id=398 bgcolor=#E9E9E9
| 76398 ||  || — || March 28, 2000 || Socorro || LINEAR || — || align=right | 3.4 km || 
|-id=399 bgcolor=#E9E9E9
| 76399 ||  || — || March 28, 2000 || Socorro || LINEAR || — || align=right | 3.3 km || 
|-id=400 bgcolor=#d6d6d6
| 76400 ||  || — || March 28, 2000 || Socorro || LINEAR || — || align=right | 13 km || 
|}

76401–76500 

|-bgcolor=#E9E9E9
| 76401 ||  || — || March 29, 2000 || Socorro || LINEAR || — || align=right | 2.8 km || 
|-id=402 bgcolor=#E9E9E9
| 76402 ||  || — || March 29, 2000 || Socorro || LINEAR || — || align=right | 4.3 km || 
|-id=403 bgcolor=#E9E9E9
| 76403 ||  || — || March 29, 2000 || Socorro || LINEAR || — || align=right | 4.4 km || 
|-id=404 bgcolor=#E9E9E9
| 76404 ||  || — || March 29, 2000 || Socorro || LINEAR || — || align=right | 3.7 km || 
|-id=405 bgcolor=#fefefe
| 76405 ||  || — || March 29, 2000 || Socorro || LINEAR || — || align=right | 5.7 km || 
|-id=406 bgcolor=#E9E9E9
| 76406 ||  || — || March 29, 2000 || Socorro || LINEAR || MAR || align=right | 6.7 km || 
|-id=407 bgcolor=#E9E9E9
| 76407 ||  || — || March 29, 2000 || Socorro || LINEAR || — || align=right | 3.1 km || 
|-id=408 bgcolor=#E9E9E9
| 76408 ||  || — || March 29, 2000 || Socorro || LINEAR || — || align=right | 4.0 km || 
|-id=409 bgcolor=#E9E9E9
| 76409 ||  || — || March 29, 2000 || Socorro || LINEAR || — || align=right | 3.9 km || 
|-id=410 bgcolor=#E9E9E9
| 76410 ||  || — || March 29, 2000 || Kvistaberg || UDAS || — || align=right | 3.1 km || 
|-id=411 bgcolor=#E9E9E9
| 76411 ||  || — || March 28, 2000 || Socorro || LINEAR || — || align=right | 5.6 km || 
|-id=412 bgcolor=#E9E9E9
| 76412 ||  || — || March 28, 2000 || Socorro || LINEAR || — || align=right | 2.6 km || 
|-id=413 bgcolor=#d6d6d6
| 76413 ||  || — || March 29, 2000 || Socorro || LINEAR || — || align=right | 4.9 km || 
|-id=414 bgcolor=#d6d6d6
| 76414 ||  || — || March 29, 2000 || Socorro || LINEAR || EOS || align=right | 4.3 km || 
|-id=415 bgcolor=#E9E9E9
| 76415 ||  || — || March 29, 2000 || Socorro || LINEAR || ADE || align=right | 5.4 km || 
|-id=416 bgcolor=#d6d6d6
| 76416 ||  || — || March 29, 2000 || Socorro || LINEAR || — || align=right | 4.3 km || 
|-id=417 bgcolor=#E9E9E9
| 76417 ||  || — || March 29, 2000 || Socorro || LINEAR || — || align=right | 5.1 km || 
|-id=418 bgcolor=#d6d6d6
| 76418 ||  || — || March 29, 2000 || Socorro || LINEAR || — || align=right | 4.2 km || 
|-id=419 bgcolor=#E9E9E9
| 76419 ||  || — || March 29, 2000 || Socorro || LINEAR || — || align=right | 6.3 km || 
|-id=420 bgcolor=#E9E9E9
| 76420 ||  || — || March 29, 2000 || Socorro || LINEAR || — || align=right | 2.6 km || 
|-id=421 bgcolor=#d6d6d6
| 76421 ||  || — || March 29, 2000 || Socorro || LINEAR || EOS || align=right | 6.0 km || 
|-id=422 bgcolor=#E9E9E9
| 76422 ||  || — || March 29, 2000 || Socorro || LINEAR || MAR || align=right | 2.7 km || 
|-id=423 bgcolor=#d6d6d6
| 76423 ||  || — || March 29, 2000 || Socorro || LINEAR || — || align=right | 6.6 km || 
|-id=424 bgcolor=#E9E9E9
| 76424 ||  || — || March 29, 2000 || Socorro || LINEAR || — || align=right | 6.1 km || 
|-id=425 bgcolor=#E9E9E9
| 76425 ||  || — || March 29, 2000 || Socorro || LINEAR || — || align=right | 4.5 km || 
|-id=426 bgcolor=#E9E9E9
| 76426 ||  || — || March 29, 2000 || Socorro || LINEAR || RAF || align=right | 2.6 km || 
|-id=427 bgcolor=#d6d6d6
| 76427 ||  || — || March 29, 2000 || Socorro || LINEAR || — || align=right | 7.2 km || 
|-id=428 bgcolor=#d6d6d6
| 76428 ||  || — || March 29, 2000 || Socorro || LINEAR || — || align=right | 4.4 km || 
|-id=429 bgcolor=#d6d6d6
| 76429 ||  || — || March 29, 2000 || Socorro || LINEAR || — || align=right | 6.6 km || 
|-id=430 bgcolor=#E9E9E9
| 76430 ||  || — || March 29, 2000 || Socorro || LINEAR || — || align=right | 5.5 km || 
|-id=431 bgcolor=#E9E9E9
| 76431 ||  || — || March 29, 2000 || Socorro || LINEAR || — || align=right | 5.6 km || 
|-id=432 bgcolor=#d6d6d6
| 76432 ||  || — || March 29, 2000 || Socorro || LINEAR || — || align=right | 9.6 km || 
|-id=433 bgcolor=#d6d6d6
| 76433 ||  || — || March 29, 2000 || Socorro || LINEAR || — || align=right | 5.0 km || 
|-id=434 bgcolor=#d6d6d6
| 76434 ||  || — || March 29, 2000 || Socorro || LINEAR || EOS || align=right | 4.0 km || 
|-id=435 bgcolor=#d6d6d6
| 76435 ||  || — || March 27, 2000 || Anderson Mesa || LONEOS || KOR || align=right | 2.9 km || 
|-id=436 bgcolor=#d6d6d6
| 76436 ||  || — || March 27, 2000 || Anderson Mesa || LONEOS || EOS || align=right | 5.0 km || 
|-id=437 bgcolor=#d6d6d6
| 76437 ||  || — || March 27, 2000 || Anderson Mesa || LONEOS || — || align=right | 9.7 km || 
|-id=438 bgcolor=#d6d6d6
| 76438 ||  || — || March 27, 2000 || Anderson Mesa || LONEOS || — || align=right | 5.0 km || 
|-id=439 bgcolor=#d6d6d6
| 76439 ||  || — || March 27, 2000 || Anderson Mesa || LONEOS || — || align=right | 6.2 km || 
|-id=440 bgcolor=#E9E9E9
| 76440 ||  || — || March 28, 2000 || Socorro || LINEAR || — || align=right | 4.6 km || 
|-id=441 bgcolor=#E9E9E9
| 76441 ||  || — || March 28, 2000 || Socorro || LINEAR || — || align=right | 3.4 km || 
|-id=442 bgcolor=#E9E9E9
| 76442 ||  || — || March 28, 2000 || Socorro || LINEAR || RAF || align=right | 2.7 km || 
|-id=443 bgcolor=#E9E9E9
| 76443 ||  || — || March 28, 2000 || Socorro || LINEAR || — || align=right | 6.5 km || 
|-id=444 bgcolor=#E9E9E9
| 76444 ||  || — || March 29, 2000 || Socorro || LINEAR || INO || align=right | 3.8 km || 
|-id=445 bgcolor=#d6d6d6
| 76445 ||  || — || March 29, 2000 || Socorro || LINEAR || EOS || align=right | 5.4 km || 
|-id=446 bgcolor=#d6d6d6
| 76446 ||  || — || March 29, 2000 || Socorro || LINEAR || — || align=right | 7.7 km || 
|-id=447 bgcolor=#E9E9E9
| 76447 ||  || — || March 29, 2000 || Socorro || LINEAR || — || align=right | 3.7 km || 
|-id=448 bgcolor=#d6d6d6
| 76448 ||  || — || March 29, 2000 || Socorro || LINEAR || — || align=right | 4.2 km || 
|-id=449 bgcolor=#d6d6d6
| 76449 ||  || — || March 29, 2000 || Socorro || LINEAR || — || align=right | 5.9 km || 
|-id=450 bgcolor=#E9E9E9
| 76450 ||  || — || March 29, 2000 || Socorro || LINEAR || MAR || align=right | 3.8 km || 
|-id=451 bgcolor=#d6d6d6
| 76451 ||  || — || March 29, 2000 || Socorro || LINEAR || — || align=right | 7.7 km || 
|-id=452 bgcolor=#d6d6d6
| 76452 ||  || — || March 29, 2000 || Socorro || LINEAR || EOS || align=right | 6.7 km || 
|-id=453 bgcolor=#d6d6d6
| 76453 ||  || — || March 29, 2000 || Socorro || LINEAR || KOR || align=right | 3.4 km || 
|-id=454 bgcolor=#d6d6d6
| 76454 ||  || — || March 29, 2000 || Socorro || LINEAR || — || align=right | 8.7 km || 
|-id=455 bgcolor=#E9E9E9
| 76455 ||  || — || March 29, 2000 || Socorro || LINEAR || — || align=right | 2.6 km || 
|-id=456 bgcolor=#d6d6d6
| 76456 ||  || — || March 29, 2000 || Socorro || LINEAR || TIR || align=right | 3.4 km || 
|-id=457 bgcolor=#d6d6d6
| 76457 ||  || — || March 29, 2000 || Socorro || LINEAR || — || align=right | 10 km || 
|-id=458 bgcolor=#E9E9E9
| 76458 ||  || — || March 29, 2000 || Socorro || LINEAR || — || align=right | 5.3 km || 
|-id=459 bgcolor=#d6d6d6
| 76459 ||  || — || March 29, 2000 || Socorro || LINEAR || BRA || align=right | 3.6 km || 
|-id=460 bgcolor=#E9E9E9
| 76460 ||  || — || March 29, 2000 || Socorro || LINEAR || ADE || align=right | 5.9 km || 
|-id=461 bgcolor=#d6d6d6
| 76461 ||  || — || March 29, 2000 || Socorro || LINEAR || EOS || align=right | 5.6 km || 
|-id=462 bgcolor=#d6d6d6
| 76462 ||  || — || March 29, 2000 || Socorro || LINEAR || — || align=right | 10 km || 
|-id=463 bgcolor=#E9E9E9
| 76463 ||  || — || March 29, 2000 || Socorro || LINEAR || RAF || align=right | 1.8 km || 
|-id=464 bgcolor=#d6d6d6
| 76464 ||  || — || March 29, 2000 || Socorro || LINEAR || — || align=right | 9.4 km || 
|-id=465 bgcolor=#E9E9E9
| 76465 ||  || — || March 29, 2000 || Socorro || LINEAR || EUN || align=right | 3.0 km || 
|-id=466 bgcolor=#d6d6d6
| 76466 ||  || — || March 29, 2000 || Socorro || LINEAR || — || align=right | 5.4 km || 
|-id=467 bgcolor=#d6d6d6
| 76467 ||  || — || March 30, 2000 || Socorro || LINEAR || TIR || align=right | 6.5 km || 
|-id=468 bgcolor=#E9E9E9
| 76468 ||  || — || March 29, 2000 || Socorro || LINEAR || — || align=right | 4.3 km || 
|-id=469 bgcolor=#d6d6d6
| 76469 ||  || — || March 29, 2000 || Socorro || LINEAR || — || align=right | 4.0 km || 
|-id=470 bgcolor=#E9E9E9
| 76470 ||  || — || March 30, 2000 || Catalina || CSS || PAD || align=right | 5.5 km || 
|-id=471 bgcolor=#d6d6d6
| 76471 ||  || — || March 30, 2000 || Catalina || CSS || EOS || align=right | 6.2 km || 
|-id=472 bgcolor=#E9E9E9
| 76472 ||  || — || March 26, 2000 || Anderson Mesa || LONEOS || — || align=right | 5.0 km || 
|-id=473 bgcolor=#E9E9E9
| 76473 ||  || — || March 26, 2000 || Anderson Mesa || LONEOS || — || align=right | 3.1 km || 
|-id=474 bgcolor=#E9E9E9
| 76474 ||  || — || March 26, 2000 || Anderson Mesa || LONEOS || WIT || align=right | 7.3 km || 
|-id=475 bgcolor=#E9E9E9
| 76475 ||  || — || March 26, 2000 || Anderson Mesa || LONEOS || — || align=right | 4.2 km || 
|-id=476 bgcolor=#E9E9E9
| 76476 ||  || — || March 26, 2000 || Anderson Mesa || LONEOS || — || align=right | 4.0 km || 
|-id=477 bgcolor=#E9E9E9
| 76477 ||  || — || March 28, 2000 || Socorro || LINEAR || — || align=right | 3.6 km || 
|-id=478 bgcolor=#d6d6d6
| 76478 ||  || — || March 29, 2000 || Socorro || LINEAR || 628 || align=right | 6.1 km || 
|-id=479 bgcolor=#d6d6d6
| 76479 ||  || — || March 26, 2000 || Anderson Mesa || LONEOS || — || align=right | 8.3 km || 
|-id=480 bgcolor=#d6d6d6
| 76480 ||  || — || March 27, 2000 || Anderson Mesa || LONEOS || EOS || align=right | 5.5 km || 
|-id=481 bgcolor=#E9E9E9
| 76481 ||  || — || March 29, 2000 || Socorro || LINEAR || MRX || align=right | 2.5 km || 
|-id=482 bgcolor=#E9E9E9
| 76482 ||  || — || March 29, 2000 || Socorro || LINEAR || — || align=right | 6.3 km || 
|-id=483 bgcolor=#E9E9E9
| 76483 ||  || — || March 27, 2000 || Anderson Mesa || LONEOS || — || align=right | 5.3 km || 
|-id=484 bgcolor=#d6d6d6
| 76484 ||  || — || March 26, 2000 || Anderson Mesa || LONEOS || — || align=right | 6.7 km || 
|-id=485 bgcolor=#d6d6d6
| 76485 ||  || — || March 27, 2000 || Anderson Mesa || LONEOS || — || align=right | 4.9 km || 
|-id=486 bgcolor=#E9E9E9
| 76486 ||  || — || March 26, 2000 || Anderson Mesa || LONEOS || — || align=right | 5.4 km || 
|-id=487 bgcolor=#E9E9E9
| 76487 ||  || — || March 26, 2000 || Anderson Mesa || LONEOS || — || align=right | 3.1 km || 
|-id=488 bgcolor=#d6d6d6
| 76488 || 2000 GG || — || April 1, 2000 || Kitt Peak || Spacewatch || — || align=right | 5.0 km || 
|-id=489 bgcolor=#E9E9E9
| 76489 ||  || — || April 3, 2000 || Socorro || LINEAR || GEF || align=right | 2.8 km || 
|-id=490 bgcolor=#E9E9E9
| 76490 ||  || — || April 4, 2000 || Socorro || LINEAR || GEF || align=right | 2.2 km || 
|-id=491 bgcolor=#E9E9E9
| 76491 ||  || — || April 4, 2000 || Socorro || LINEAR || — || align=right | 4.0 km || 
|-id=492 bgcolor=#E9E9E9
| 76492 ||  || — || April 5, 2000 || Socorro || LINEAR || — || align=right | 4.6 km || 
|-id=493 bgcolor=#E9E9E9
| 76493 ||  || — || April 5, 2000 || Socorro || LINEAR || — || align=right | 5.3 km || 
|-id=494 bgcolor=#E9E9E9
| 76494 ||  || — || April 5, 2000 || Socorro || LINEAR || — || align=right | 5.1 km || 
|-id=495 bgcolor=#E9E9E9
| 76495 ||  || — || April 5, 2000 || Socorro || LINEAR || — || align=right | 4.8 km || 
|-id=496 bgcolor=#d6d6d6
| 76496 ||  || — || April 5, 2000 || Socorro || LINEAR || — || align=right | 5.8 km || 
|-id=497 bgcolor=#E9E9E9
| 76497 ||  || — || April 5, 2000 || Socorro || LINEAR || AGN || align=right | 2.7 km || 
|-id=498 bgcolor=#d6d6d6
| 76498 ||  || — || April 5, 2000 || Socorro || LINEAR || EOS || align=right | 4.7 km || 
|-id=499 bgcolor=#E9E9E9
| 76499 ||  || — || April 5, 2000 || Socorro || LINEAR || — || align=right | 3.3 km || 
|-id=500 bgcolor=#d6d6d6
| 76500 ||  || — || April 5, 2000 || Socorro || LINEAR || — || align=right | 6.5 km || 
|}

76501–76600 

|-bgcolor=#d6d6d6
| 76501 ||  || — || April 5, 2000 || Socorro || LINEAR || KOR || align=right | 3.2 km || 
|-id=502 bgcolor=#d6d6d6
| 76502 ||  || — || April 5, 2000 || Socorro || LINEAR || EOS || align=right | 4.6 km || 
|-id=503 bgcolor=#d6d6d6
| 76503 ||  || — || April 5, 2000 || Socorro || LINEAR || KOR || align=right | 2.8 km || 
|-id=504 bgcolor=#d6d6d6
| 76504 ||  || — || April 5, 2000 || Socorro || LINEAR || KOR || align=right | 3.4 km || 
|-id=505 bgcolor=#d6d6d6
| 76505 ||  || — || April 5, 2000 || Socorro || LINEAR || — || align=right | 9.9 km || 
|-id=506 bgcolor=#d6d6d6
| 76506 ||  || — || April 5, 2000 || Socorro || LINEAR || KOR || align=right | 3.4 km || 
|-id=507 bgcolor=#d6d6d6
| 76507 ||  || — || April 5, 2000 || Socorro || LINEAR || KOR || align=right | 3.1 km || 
|-id=508 bgcolor=#d6d6d6
| 76508 ||  || — || April 5, 2000 || Socorro || LINEAR || KOR || align=right | 2.9 km || 
|-id=509 bgcolor=#E9E9E9
| 76509 ||  || — || April 5, 2000 || Socorro || LINEAR || — || align=right | 4.2 km || 
|-id=510 bgcolor=#d6d6d6
| 76510 ||  || — || April 5, 2000 || Socorro || LINEAR || — || align=right | 2.7 km || 
|-id=511 bgcolor=#d6d6d6
| 76511 ||  || — || April 5, 2000 || Socorro || LINEAR || — || align=right | 4.6 km || 
|-id=512 bgcolor=#E9E9E9
| 76512 ||  || — || April 5, 2000 || Socorro || LINEAR || — || align=right | 5.3 km || 
|-id=513 bgcolor=#d6d6d6
| 76513 ||  || — || April 5, 2000 || Socorro || LINEAR || — || align=right | 4.0 km || 
|-id=514 bgcolor=#d6d6d6
| 76514 ||  || — || April 5, 2000 || Socorro || LINEAR || URS || align=right | 6.4 km || 
|-id=515 bgcolor=#d6d6d6
| 76515 ||  || — || April 5, 2000 || Socorro || LINEAR || EOS || align=right | 4.8 km || 
|-id=516 bgcolor=#d6d6d6
| 76516 ||  || — || April 5, 2000 || Socorro || LINEAR || THM || align=right | 5.5 km || 
|-id=517 bgcolor=#E9E9E9
| 76517 ||  || — || April 5, 2000 || Socorro || LINEAR || DOR || align=right | 7.1 km || 
|-id=518 bgcolor=#d6d6d6
| 76518 ||  || — || April 5, 2000 || Socorro || LINEAR || — || align=right | 6.0 km || 
|-id=519 bgcolor=#d6d6d6
| 76519 ||  || — || April 5, 2000 || Socorro || LINEAR || HYG || align=right | 8.2 km || 
|-id=520 bgcolor=#d6d6d6
| 76520 ||  || — || April 5, 2000 || Socorro || LINEAR || — || align=right | 6.0 km || 
|-id=521 bgcolor=#d6d6d6
| 76521 ||  || — || April 5, 2000 || Socorro || LINEAR || HYG || align=right | 8.9 km || 
|-id=522 bgcolor=#d6d6d6
| 76522 ||  || — || April 5, 2000 || Socorro || LINEAR || — || align=right | 9.8 km || 
|-id=523 bgcolor=#E9E9E9
| 76523 ||  || — || April 5, 2000 || Socorro || LINEAR || — || align=right | 7.4 km || 
|-id=524 bgcolor=#d6d6d6
| 76524 ||  || — || April 5, 2000 || Socorro || LINEAR || — || align=right | 6.9 km || 
|-id=525 bgcolor=#d6d6d6
| 76525 ||  || — || April 5, 2000 || Socorro || LINEAR || — || align=right | 6.0 km || 
|-id=526 bgcolor=#d6d6d6
| 76526 ||  || — || April 5, 2000 || Socorro || LINEAR || — || align=right | 6.3 km || 
|-id=527 bgcolor=#E9E9E9
| 76527 ||  || — || April 5, 2000 || Socorro || LINEAR || — || align=right | 6.8 km || 
|-id=528 bgcolor=#E9E9E9
| 76528 ||  || — || April 5, 2000 || Socorro || LINEAR || EUN || align=right | 4.1 km || 
|-id=529 bgcolor=#E9E9E9
| 76529 ||  || — || April 5, 2000 || Socorro || LINEAR || — || align=right | 3.7 km || 
|-id=530 bgcolor=#d6d6d6
| 76530 ||  || — || April 5, 2000 || Socorro || LINEAR || — || align=right | 4.5 km || 
|-id=531 bgcolor=#d6d6d6
| 76531 ||  || — || April 5, 2000 || Socorro || LINEAR || — || align=right | 5.2 km || 
|-id=532 bgcolor=#d6d6d6
| 76532 ||  || — || April 5, 2000 || Socorro || LINEAR || THM || align=right | 6.0 km || 
|-id=533 bgcolor=#d6d6d6
| 76533 ||  || — || April 5, 2000 || Socorro || LINEAR || HYG || align=right | 5.8 km || 
|-id=534 bgcolor=#d6d6d6
| 76534 ||  || — || April 5, 2000 || Socorro || LINEAR || — || align=right | 9.2 km || 
|-id=535 bgcolor=#d6d6d6
| 76535 ||  || — || April 5, 2000 || Socorro || LINEAR || EOS || align=right | 4.0 km || 
|-id=536 bgcolor=#d6d6d6
| 76536 ||  || — || April 5, 2000 || Socorro || LINEAR || — || align=right | 5.2 km || 
|-id=537 bgcolor=#E9E9E9
| 76537 ||  || — || April 5, 2000 || Socorro || LINEAR || — || align=right | 3.8 km || 
|-id=538 bgcolor=#d6d6d6
| 76538 ||  || — || April 5, 2000 || Socorro || LINEAR || — || align=right | 9.0 km || 
|-id=539 bgcolor=#d6d6d6
| 76539 ||  || — || April 5, 2000 || Socorro || LINEAR || EOS || align=right | 4.0 km || 
|-id=540 bgcolor=#d6d6d6
| 76540 ||  || — || April 5, 2000 || Socorro || LINEAR || CRO || align=right | 6.9 km || 
|-id=541 bgcolor=#E9E9E9
| 76541 ||  || — || April 6, 2000 || Socorro || LINEAR || — || align=right | 7.4 km || 
|-id=542 bgcolor=#d6d6d6
| 76542 ||  || — || April 6, 2000 || Socorro || LINEAR || THM || align=right | 5.9 km || 
|-id=543 bgcolor=#E9E9E9
| 76543 ||  || — || April 13, 2000 || Socorro || LINEAR || — || align=right | 5.7 km || 
|-id=544 bgcolor=#E9E9E9
| 76544 ||  || — || April 2, 2000 || Socorro || LINEAR || — || align=right | 5.4 km || 
|-id=545 bgcolor=#E9E9E9
| 76545 ||  || — || April 2, 2000 || Socorro || LINEAR || — || align=right | 4.0 km || 
|-id=546 bgcolor=#E9E9E9
| 76546 ||  || — || April 2, 2000 || Socorro || LINEAR || HNS || align=right | 4.4 km || 
|-id=547 bgcolor=#E9E9E9
| 76547 ||  || — || April 3, 2000 || Socorro || LINEAR || — || align=right | 5.0 km || 
|-id=548 bgcolor=#E9E9E9
| 76548 ||  || — || April 3, 2000 || Socorro || LINEAR || EUN || align=right | 4.1 km || 
|-id=549 bgcolor=#E9E9E9
| 76549 ||  || — || April 3, 2000 || Socorro || LINEAR || EUN || align=right | 4.2 km || 
|-id=550 bgcolor=#E9E9E9
| 76550 ||  || — || April 3, 2000 || Socorro || LINEAR || — || align=right | 4.7 km || 
|-id=551 bgcolor=#d6d6d6
| 76551 ||  || — || April 4, 2000 || Socorro || LINEAR || ALA || align=right | 9.9 km || 
|-id=552 bgcolor=#d6d6d6
| 76552 ||  || — || April 4, 2000 || Socorro || LINEAR || HYG || align=right | 7.8 km || 
|-id=553 bgcolor=#d6d6d6
| 76553 ||  || — || April 4, 2000 || Socorro || LINEAR || TEL || align=right | 4.0 km || 
|-id=554 bgcolor=#d6d6d6
| 76554 ||  || — || April 5, 2000 || Socorro || LINEAR || EOS || align=right | 8.7 km || 
|-id=555 bgcolor=#E9E9E9
| 76555 ||  || — || April 5, 2000 || Socorro || LINEAR || — || align=right | 5.7 km || 
|-id=556 bgcolor=#d6d6d6
| 76556 ||  || — || April 5, 2000 || Socorro || LINEAR || — || align=right | 4.7 km || 
|-id=557 bgcolor=#d6d6d6
| 76557 ||  || — || April 6, 2000 || Socorro || LINEAR || — || align=right | 7.2 km || 
|-id=558 bgcolor=#E9E9E9
| 76558 ||  || — || April 7, 2000 || Socorro || LINEAR || ADE || align=right | 5.2 km || 
|-id=559 bgcolor=#E9E9E9
| 76559 ||  || — || April 7, 2000 || Socorro || LINEAR || — || align=right | 3.7 km || 
|-id=560 bgcolor=#d6d6d6
| 76560 ||  || — || April 7, 2000 || Socorro || LINEAR || NAE || align=right | 7.2 km || 
|-id=561 bgcolor=#d6d6d6
| 76561 ||  || — || April 7, 2000 || Socorro || LINEAR || — || align=right | 6.1 km || 
|-id=562 bgcolor=#E9E9E9
| 76562 ||  || — || April 7, 2000 || Socorro || LINEAR || — || align=right | 3.9 km || 
|-id=563 bgcolor=#E9E9E9
| 76563 ||  || — || April 7, 2000 || Socorro || LINEAR || HEN || align=right | 2.7 km || 
|-id=564 bgcolor=#d6d6d6
| 76564 ||  || — || April 7, 2000 || Socorro || LINEAR || 615 || align=right | 7.1 km || 
|-id=565 bgcolor=#E9E9E9
| 76565 ||  || — || April 7, 2000 || Socorro || LINEAR || — || align=right | 2.9 km || 
|-id=566 bgcolor=#E9E9E9
| 76566 ||  || — || April 7, 2000 || Socorro || LINEAR || — || align=right | 2.6 km || 
|-id=567 bgcolor=#d6d6d6
| 76567 ||  || — || April 7, 2000 || Socorro || LINEAR || — || align=right | 6.9 km || 
|-id=568 bgcolor=#E9E9E9
| 76568 ||  || — || April 2, 2000 || Anderson Mesa || LONEOS || ADE || align=right | 8.0 km || 
|-id=569 bgcolor=#d6d6d6
| 76569 ||  || — || April 2, 2000 || Anderson Mesa || LONEOS || — || align=right | 8.7 km || 
|-id=570 bgcolor=#d6d6d6
| 76570 ||  || — || April 2, 2000 || Anderson Mesa || LONEOS || — || align=right | 9.5 km || 
|-id=571 bgcolor=#fefefe
| 76571 ||  || — || April 3, 2000 || Socorro || LINEAR || PHO || align=right | 2.2 km || 
|-id=572 bgcolor=#d6d6d6
| 76572 ||  || — || April 7, 2000 || Socorro || LINEAR || — || align=right | 5.6 km || 
|-id=573 bgcolor=#d6d6d6
| 76573 ||  || — || April 7, 2000 || Socorro || LINEAR || — || align=right | 4.8 km || 
|-id=574 bgcolor=#d6d6d6
| 76574 ||  || — || April 7, 2000 || Socorro || LINEAR || — || align=right | 10 km || 
|-id=575 bgcolor=#d6d6d6
| 76575 ||  || — || April 8, 2000 || Socorro || LINEAR || KOR || align=right | 3.9 km || 
|-id=576 bgcolor=#E9E9E9
| 76576 ||  || — || April 3, 2000 || Kitt Peak || Spacewatch || — || align=right | 4.1 km || 
|-id=577 bgcolor=#d6d6d6
| 76577 ||  || — || April 7, 2000 || Kitt Peak || Spacewatch || — || align=right | 5.7 km || 
|-id=578 bgcolor=#d6d6d6
| 76578 ||  || — || April 7, 2000 || Socorro || LINEAR || — || align=right | 7.8 km || 
|-id=579 bgcolor=#E9E9E9
| 76579 ||  || — || April 7, 2000 || Socorro || LINEAR || — || align=right | 3.4 km || 
|-id=580 bgcolor=#d6d6d6
| 76580 ||  || — || April 10, 2000 || Kitt Peak || Spacewatch || ALA || align=right | 6.7 km || 
|-id=581 bgcolor=#d6d6d6
| 76581 ||  || — || April 8, 2000 || Socorro || LINEAR || — || align=right | 8.0 km || 
|-id=582 bgcolor=#E9E9E9
| 76582 ||  || — || April 8, 2000 || Socorro || LINEAR || — || align=right | 4.3 km || 
|-id=583 bgcolor=#d6d6d6
| 76583 ||  || — || April 12, 2000 || Socorro || LINEAR || ALA || align=right | 16 km || 
|-id=584 bgcolor=#d6d6d6
| 76584 ||  || — || April 4, 2000 || Anderson Mesa || LONEOS || KOR || align=right | 3.3 km || 
|-id=585 bgcolor=#d6d6d6
| 76585 ||  || — || April 4, 2000 || Anderson Mesa || LONEOS || EOS || align=right | 4.9 km || 
|-id=586 bgcolor=#d6d6d6
| 76586 ||  || — || April 7, 2000 || Anderson Mesa || LONEOS || 7:4 || align=right | 10 km || 
|-id=587 bgcolor=#E9E9E9
| 76587 ||  || — || April 7, 2000 || Anderson Mesa || LONEOS || EUN || align=right | 3.2 km || 
|-id=588 bgcolor=#d6d6d6
| 76588 ||  || — || April 7, 2000 || Anderson Mesa || LONEOS || — || align=right | 4.6 km || 
|-id=589 bgcolor=#E9E9E9
| 76589 ||  || — || April 7, 2000 || Anderson Mesa || LONEOS || EUN || align=right | 3.5 km || 
|-id=590 bgcolor=#E9E9E9
| 76590 ||  || — || April 7, 2000 || Anderson Mesa || LONEOS || — || align=right | 4.4 km || 
|-id=591 bgcolor=#d6d6d6
| 76591 ||  || — || April 7, 2000 || Anderson Mesa || LONEOS || — || align=right | 5.0 km || 
|-id=592 bgcolor=#d6d6d6
| 76592 ||  || — || April 5, 2000 || Socorro || LINEAR || HYG || align=right | 4.0 km || 
|-id=593 bgcolor=#d6d6d6
| 76593 ||  || — || April 6, 2000 || Anderson Mesa || LONEOS || — || align=right | 6.1 km || 
|-id=594 bgcolor=#d6d6d6
| 76594 ||  || — || April 6, 2000 || Anderson Mesa || LONEOS || EOS || align=right | 4.8 km || 
|-id=595 bgcolor=#E9E9E9
| 76595 ||  || — || April 7, 2000 || Socorro || LINEAR || — || align=right | 3.8 km || 
|-id=596 bgcolor=#E9E9E9
| 76596 ||  || — || April 7, 2000 || Socorro || LINEAR || — || align=right | 10 km || 
|-id=597 bgcolor=#E9E9E9
| 76597 ||  || — || April 7, 2000 || Socorro || LINEAR || — || align=right | 6.2 km || 
|-id=598 bgcolor=#d6d6d6
| 76598 ||  || — || April 7, 2000 || Anderson Mesa || LONEOS || — || align=right | 6.4 km || 
|-id=599 bgcolor=#d6d6d6
| 76599 ||  || — || April 7, 2000 || Anderson Mesa || LONEOS || 628 || align=right | 4.0 km || 
|-id=600 bgcolor=#d6d6d6
| 76600 ||  || — || April 7, 2000 || Socorro || LINEAR || — || align=right | 3.7 km || 
|}

76601–76700 

|-bgcolor=#d6d6d6
| 76601 ||  || — || April 7, 2000 || Socorro || LINEAR || — || align=right | 7.6 km || 
|-id=602 bgcolor=#E9E9E9
| 76602 ||  || — || April 7, 2000 || Socorro || LINEAR || EUN || align=right | 3.0 km || 
|-id=603 bgcolor=#d6d6d6
| 76603 ||  || — || April 7, 2000 || Socorro || LINEAR || — || align=right | 5.6 km || 
|-id=604 bgcolor=#d6d6d6
| 76604 ||  || — || April 7, 2000 || Anderson Mesa || LONEOS || EOS || align=right | 3.6 km || 
|-id=605 bgcolor=#d6d6d6
| 76605 ||  || — || April 7, 2000 || Anderson Mesa || LONEOS || — || align=right | 4.7 km || 
|-id=606 bgcolor=#d6d6d6
| 76606 ||  || — || April 7, 2000 || Anderson Mesa || LONEOS || — || align=right | 4.9 km || 
|-id=607 bgcolor=#E9E9E9
| 76607 ||  || — || April 8, 2000 || Socorro || LINEAR || — || align=right | 2.4 km || 
|-id=608 bgcolor=#d6d6d6
| 76608 ||  || — || April 10, 2000 || Socorro || LINEAR || EOS || align=right | 8.6 km || 
|-id=609 bgcolor=#E9E9E9
| 76609 ||  || — || April 10, 2000 || Haleakala || NEAT || EUN || align=right | 3.0 km || 
|-id=610 bgcolor=#d6d6d6
| 76610 ||  || — || April 5, 2000 || Socorro || LINEAR || EOS || align=right | 3.6 km || 
|-id=611 bgcolor=#d6d6d6
| 76611 ||  || — || April 5, 2000 || Socorro || LINEAR || — || align=right | 8.7 km || 
|-id=612 bgcolor=#E9E9E9
| 76612 ||  || — || April 4, 2000 || Anderson Mesa || LONEOS || — || align=right | 5.2 km || 
|-id=613 bgcolor=#d6d6d6
| 76613 ||  || — || April 4, 2000 || Socorro || LINEAR || — || align=right | 5.1 km || 
|-id=614 bgcolor=#d6d6d6
| 76614 ||  || — || April 4, 2000 || Anderson Mesa || LONEOS || — || align=right | 4.4 km || 
|-id=615 bgcolor=#d6d6d6
| 76615 ||  || — || April 2, 2000 || Anderson Mesa || LONEOS || VER || align=right | 4.3 km || 
|-id=616 bgcolor=#d6d6d6
| 76616 ||  || — || April 2, 2000 || Anderson Mesa || LONEOS || EOS || align=right | 4.9 km || 
|-id=617 bgcolor=#E9E9E9
| 76617 ||  || — || April 5, 2000 || Anderson Mesa || LONEOS || — || align=right | 6.5 km || 
|-id=618 bgcolor=#E9E9E9
| 76618 ||  || — || April 5, 2000 || Anderson Mesa || LONEOS || — || align=right | 3.5 km || 
|-id=619 bgcolor=#d6d6d6
| 76619 ||  || — || April 5, 2000 || Anderson Mesa || LONEOS || EOS || align=right | 4.8 km || 
|-id=620 bgcolor=#E9E9E9
| 76620 ||  || — || April 2, 2000 || Anderson Mesa || LONEOS || JUN || align=right | 2.8 km || 
|-id=621 bgcolor=#d6d6d6
| 76621 ||  || — || April 2, 2000 || Anderson Mesa || LONEOS || — || align=right | 6.0 km || 
|-id=622 bgcolor=#d6d6d6
| 76622 ||  || — || April 3, 2000 || Kitt Peak || Spacewatch || HYG || align=right | 7.2 km || 
|-id=623 bgcolor=#E9E9E9
| 76623 ||  || — || April 3, 2000 || Socorro || LINEAR || EUN || align=right | 2.9 km || 
|-id=624 bgcolor=#d6d6d6
| 76624 ||  || — || April 4, 2000 || Socorro || LINEAR || — || align=right | 9.4 km || 
|-id=625 bgcolor=#E9E9E9
| 76625 ||  || — || April 4, 2000 || Anderson Mesa || LONEOS || — || align=right | 5.7 km || 
|-id=626 bgcolor=#d6d6d6
| 76626 ||  || — || April 2, 2000 || Kitt Peak || Spacewatch || HYG || align=right | 7.2 km || 
|-id=627 bgcolor=#d6d6d6
| 76627 ||  || — || April 4, 2000 || Anderson Mesa || LONEOS || 629 || align=right | 3.5 km || 
|-id=628 bgcolor=#d6d6d6
| 76628 Kozí Hrádek || 2000 HC ||  || April 22, 2000 || Kleť || J. Tichá, M. Tichý || — || align=right | 3.7 km || 
|-id=629 bgcolor=#E9E9E9
| 76629 || 2000 HG || — || April 23, 2000 || Kurohone || T. Kobayashi || EUN || align=right | 5.3 km || 
|-id=630 bgcolor=#d6d6d6
| 76630 ||  || — || April 26, 2000 || Kitt Peak || Spacewatch || — || align=right | 6.3 km || 
|-id=631 bgcolor=#E9E9E9
| 76631 ||  || — || April 27, 2000 || Socorro || LINEAR || — || align=right | 5.7 km || 
|-id=632 bgcolor=#d6d6d6
| 76632 ||  || — || April 24, 2000 || Kitt Peak || Spacewatch || THM || align=right | 4.8 km || 
|-id=633 bgcolor=#d6d6d6
| 76633 ||  || — || April 24, 2000 || Kitt Peak || Spacewatch || THM || align=right | 6.2 km || 
|-id=634 bgcolor=#d6d6d6
| 76634 ||  || — || April 27, 2000 || Socorro || LINEAR || — || align=right | 4.7 km || 
|-id=635 bgcolor=#E9E9E9
| 76635 ||  || — || April 27, 2000 || Socorro || LINEAR || — || align=right | 4.3 km || 
|-id=636 bgcolor=#d6d6d6
| 76636 ||  || — || April 28, 2000 || Socorro || LINEAR || — || align=right | 5.4 km || 
|-id=637 bgcolor=#d6d6d6
| 76637 ||  || — || April 28, 2000 || Socorro || LINEAR || THM || align=right | 10 km || 
|-id=638 bgcolor=#d6d6d6
| 76638 ||  || — || April 29, 2000 || Prescott || P. G. Comba || — || align=right | 13 km || 
|-id=639 bgcolor=#d6d6d6
| 76639 ||  || — || April 29, 2000 || Socorro || LINEAR || — || align=right | 3.4 km || 
|-id=640 bgcolor=#d6d6d6
| 76640 ||  || — || April 29, 2000 || Socorro || LINEAR || — || align=right | 4.8 km || 
|-id=641 bgcolor=#E9E9E9
| 76641 ||  || — || April 27, 2000 || Socorro || LINEAR || — || align=right | 5.5 km || 
|-id=642 bgcolor=#d6d6d6
| 76642 ||  || — || April 27, 2000 || Socorro || LINEAR || EOS || align=right | 4.6 km || 
|-id=643 bgcolor=#d6d6d6
| 76643 ||  || — || April 30, 2000 || Socorro || LINEAR || ALA || align=right | 7.7 km || 
|-id=644 bgcolor=#E9E9E9
| 76644 ||  || — || April 24, 2000 || Anderson Mesa || LONEOS || GEF || align=right | 3.7 km || 
|-id=645 bgcolor=#d6d6d6
| 76645 ||  || — || April 24, 2000 || Anderson Mesa || LONEOS || — || align=right | 4.0 km || 
|-id=646 bgcolor=#d6d6d6
| 76646 ||  || — || April 24, 2000 || Anderson Mesa || LONEOS || ALA || align=right | 13 km || 
|-id=647 bgcolor=#d6d6d6
| 76647 ||  || — || April 28, 2000 || Socorro || LINEAR || URS || align=right | 8.8 km || 
|-id=648 bgcolor=#d6d6d6
| 76648 ||  || — || April 29, 2000 || Socorro || LINEAR || AEG || align=right | 10 km || 
|-id=649 bgcolor=#d6d6d6
| 76649 ||  || — || April 29, 2000 || Socorro || LINEAR || — || align=right | 11 km || 
|-id=650 bgcolor=#d6d6d6
| 76650 ||  || — || April 29, 2000 || Socorro || LINEAR || TIR || align=right | 6.8 km || 
|-id=651 bgcolor=#E9E9E9
| 76651 ||  || — || April 24, 2000 || Anderson Mesa || LONEOS || — || align=right | 9.9 km || 
|-id=652 bgcolor=#d6d6d6
| 76652 ||  || — || April 27, 2000 || Socorro || LINEAR || — || align=right | 9.4 km || 
|-id=653 bgcolor=#d6d6d6
| 76653 ||  || — || April 27, 2000 || Socorro || LINEAR || EOS || align=right | 4.3 km || 
|-id=654 bgcolor=#d6d6d6
| 76654 ||  || — || April 27, 2000 || Socorro || LINEAR || EOS || align=right | 5.0 km || 
|-id=655 bgcolor=#E9E9E9
| 76655 ||  || — || April 28, 2000 || Socorro || LINEAR || — || align=right | 3.4 km || 
|-id=656 bgcolor=#d6d6d6
| 76656 ||  || — || April 28, 2000 || Socorro || LINEAR || EOS || align=right | 7.8 km || 
|-id=657 bgcolor=#E9E9E9
| 76657 ||  || — || April 28, 2000 || Socorro || LINEAR || — || align=right | 4.0 km || 
|-id=658 bgcolor=#E9E9E9
| 76658 ||  || — || April 28, 2000 || Socorro || LINEAR || — || align=right | 5.6 km || 
|-id=659 bgcolor=#E9E9E9
| 76659 ||  || — || April 28, 2000 || Socorro || LINEAR || EUN || align=right | 3.8 km || 
|-id=660 bgcolor=#d6d6d6
| 76660 ||  || — || April 28, 2000 || Socorro || LINEAR || — || align=right | 8.3 km || 
|-id=661 bgcolor=#d6d6d6
| 76661 ||  || — || April 29, 2000 || Kitt Peak || Spacewatch || EOS || align=right | 5.3 km || 
|-id=662 bgcolor=#d6d6d6
| 76662 ||  || — || April 28, 2000 || Socorro || LINEAR || — || align=right | 7.9 km || 
|-id=663 bgcolor=#d6d6d6
| 76663 ||  || — || April 28, 2000 || Socorro || LINEAR || — || align=right | 4.1 km || 
|-id=664 bgcolor=#E9E9E9
| 76664 ||  || — || April 28, 2000 || Socorro || LINEAR || — || align=right | 3.8 km || 
|-id=665 bgcolor=#E9E9E9
| 76665 ||  || — || April 28, 2000 || Anderson Mesa || LONEOS || GAL || align=right | 3.4 km || 
|-id=666 bgcolor=#d6d6d6
| 76666 ||  || — || April 29, 2000 || Socorro || LINEAR || THM || align=right | 6.2 km || 
|-id=667 bgcolor=#d6d6d6
| 76667 ||  || — || April 29, 2000 || Socorro || LINEAR || — || align=right | 4.9 km || 
|-id=668 bgcolor=#E9E9E9
| 76668 ||  || — || April 26, 2000 || Anderson Mesa || LONEOS || XIZ || align=right | 5.4 km || 
|-id=669 bgcolor=#E9E9E9
| 76669 ||  || — || April 29, 2000 || Socorro || LINEAR || — || align=right | 5.5 km || 
|-id=670 bgcolor=#fefefe
| 76670 ||  || — || April 29, 2000 || Socorro || LINEAR || — || align=right | 1.9 km || 
|-id=671 bgcolor=#d6d6d6
| 76671 ||  || — || April 29, 2000 || Socorro || LINEAR || — || align=right | 5.8 km || 
|-id=672 bgcolor=#d6d6d6
| 76672 ||  || — || April 24, 2000 || Anderson Mesa || LONEOS || 7:4 || align=right | 13 km || 
|-id=673 bgcolor=#d6d6d6
| 76673 ||  || — || April 24, 2000 || Anderson Mesa || LONEOS || THM || align=right | 7.4 km || 
|-id=674 bgcolor=#d6d6d6
| 76674 ||  || — || April 24, 2000 || Kitt Peak || Spacewatch || — || align=right | 7.1 km || 
|-id=675 bgcolor=#d6d6d6
| 76675 ||  || — || April 25, 2000 || Anderson Mesa || LONEOS || — || align=right | 4.6 km || 
|-id=676 bgcolor=#d6d6d6
| 76676 ||  || — || April 25, 2000 || Kitt Peak || Spacewatch || — || align=right | 4.4 km || 
|-id=677 bgcolor=#d6d6d6
| 76677 ||  || — || April 26, 2000 || Anderson Mesa || LONEOS || — || align=right | 11 km || 
|-id=678 bgcolor=#d6d6d6
| 76678 ||  || — || April 26, 2000 || Anderson Mesa || LONEOS || HYG || align=right | 6.1 km || 
|-id=679 bgcolor=#d6d6d6
| 76679 ||  || — || April 26, 2000 || Anderson Mesa || LONEOS || HYG || align=right | 10 km || 
|-id=680 bgcolor=#E9E9E9
| 76680 ||  || — || April 26, 2000 || Anderson Mesa || LONEOS || — || align=right | 3.2 km || 
|-id=681 bgcolor=#d6d6d6
| 76681 ||  || — || April 26, 2000 || Kitt Peak || Spacewatch || THM || align=right | 6.0 km || 
|-id=682 bgcolor=#d6d6d6
| 76682 ||  || — || April 26, 2000 || Kitt Peak || Spacewatch || — || align=right | 4.4 km || 
|-id=683 bgcolor=#d6d6d6
| 76683 ||  || — || April 28, 2000 || Kitt Peak || Spacewatch || — || align=right | 6.3 km || 
|-id=684 bgcolor=#d6d6d6
| 76684 ||  || — || April 26, 2000 || Anderson Mesa || LONEOS || — || align=right | 3.8 km || 
|-id=685 bgcolor=#d6d6d6
| 76685 ||  || — || April 25, 2000 || Anderson Mesa || LONEOS || — || align=right | 5.1 km || 
|-id=686 bgcolor=#d6d6d6
| 76686 ||  || — || April 26, 2000 || Anderson Mesa || LONEOS || KAR || align=right | 2.8 km || 
|-id=687 bgcolor=#E9E9E9
| 76687 ||  || — || April 27, 2000 || Anderson Mesa || LONEOS || EUN || align=right | 2.7 km || 
|-id=688 bgcolor=#d6d6d6
| 76688 ||  || — || April 27, 2000 || Anderson Mesa || LONEOS || — || align=right | 4.3 km || 
|-id=689 bgcolor=#d6d6d6
| 76689 ||  || — || April 27, 2000 || Anderson Mesa || LONEOS || — || align=right | 3.9 km || 
|-id=690 bgcolor=#d6d6d6
| 76690 ||  || — || April 28, 2000 || Socorro || LINEAR || — || align=right | 7.4 km || 
|-id=691 bgcolor=#d6d6d6
| 76691 ||  || — || April 27, 2000 || Socorro || LINEAR || — || align=right | 6.5 km || 
|-id=692 bgcolor=#E9E9E9
| 76692 ||  || — || April 27, 2000 || Socorro || LINEAR || ADE || align=right | 3.5 km || 
|-id=693 bgcolor=#E9E9E9
| 76693 ||  || — || April 28, 2000 || Anderson Mesa || LONEOS || HNS || align=right | 2.7 km || 
|-id=694 bgcolor=#d6d6d6
| 76694 ||  || — || April 28, 2000 || Anderson Mesa || LONEOS || — || align=right | 10 km || 
|-id=695 bgcolor=#d6d6d6
| 76695 ||  || — || April 28, 2000 || Anderson Mesa || LONEOS || — || align=right | 6.8 km || 
|-id=696 bgcolor=#d6d6d6
| 76696 ||  || — || April 29, 2000 || Socorro || LINEAR || TIR || align=right | 4.5 km || 
|-id=697 bgcolor=#d6d6d6
| 76697 ||  || — || April 29, 2000 || Anderson Mesa || LONEOS || — || align=right | 8.5 km || 
|-id=698 bgcolor=#d6d6d6
| 76698 ||  || — || April 30, 2000 || Anderson Mesa || LONEOS || ALA || align=right | 6.6 km || 
|-id=699 bgcolor=#E9E9E9
| 76699 ||  || — || April 30, 2000 || Anderson Mesa || LONEOS || — || align=right | 5.3 km || 
|-id=700 bgcolor=#d6d6d6
| 76700 ||  || — || April 30, 2000 || Anderson Mesa || LONEOS || — || align=right | 6.6 km || 
|}

76701–76800 

|-bgcolor=#d6d6d6
| 76701 ||  || — || April 27, 2000 || Socorro || LINEAR || EOS || align=right | 5.5 km || 
|-id=702 bgcolor=#E9E9E9
| 76702 ||  || — || April 27, 2000 || Socorro || LINEAR || — || align=right | 4.0 km || 
|-id=703 bgcolor=#d6d6d6
| 76703 ||  || — || April 27, 2000 || Socorro || LINEAR || — || align=right | 7.7 km || 
|-id=704 bgcolor=#d6d6d6
| 76704 ||  || — || April 29, 2000 || Socorro || LINEAR || — || align=right | 4.8 km || 
|-id=705 bgcolor=#d6d6d6
| 76705 ||  || — || April 29, 2000 || Socorro || LINEAR || EOS || align=right | 4.7 km || 
|-id=706 bgcolor=#E9E9E9
| 76706 ||  || — || April 29, 2000 || Socorro || LINEAR || — || align=right | 3.4 km || 
|-id=707 bgcolor=#d6d6d6
| 76707 ||  || — || April 29, 2000 || Anderson Mesa || LONEOS || ALA || align=right | 9.0 km || 
|-id=708 bgcolor=#d6d6d6
| 76708 ||  || — || April 25, 2000 || Anderson Mesa || LONEOS || slow || align=right | 7.3 km || 
|-id=709 bgcolor=#d6d6d6
| 76709 ||  || — || April 27, 2000 || Anderson Mesa || LONEOS || — || align=right | 4.0 km || 
|-id=710 bgcolor=#E9E9E9
| 76710 ||  || — || April 28, 2000 || Anderson Mesa || LONEOS || — || align=right | 5.3 km || 
|-id=711 bgcolor=#d6d6d6
| 76711 ||  || — || May 3, 2000 || Socorro || LINEAR || — || align=right | 5.0 km || 
|-id=712 bgcolor=#d6d6d6
| 76712 ||  || — || May 3, 2000 || Kitt Peak || Spacewatch || EOS || align=right | 3.0 km || 
|-id=713 bgcolor=#d6d6d6
| 76713 Wudia ||  ||  || May 6, 2000 || Ondřejov || Ondřejov Obs. || — || align=right | 7.8 km || 
|-id=714 bgcolor=#d6d6d6
| 76714 ||  || — || May 5, 2000 || Socorro || LINEAR || — || align=right | 8.7 km || 
|-id=715 bgcolor=#d6d6d6
| 76715 ||  || — || May 3, 2000 || Socorro || LINEAR || ALA || align=right | 6.7 km || 
|-id=716 bgcolor=#E9E9E9
| 76716 ||  || — || May 5, 2000 || Socorro || LINEAR || — || align=right | 4.7 km || 
|-id=717 bgcolor=#d6d6d6
| 76717 ||  || — || May 5, 2000 || Socorro || LINEAR || — || align=right | 8.0 km || 
|-id=718 bgcolor=#E9E9E9
| 76718 ||  || — || May 5, 2000 || Socorro || LINEAR || — || align=right | 7.8 km || 
|-id=719 bgcolor=#E9E9E9
| 76719 ||  || — || May 2, 2000 || Socorro || LINEAR || — || align=right | 2.6 km || 
|-id=720 bgcolor=#d6d6d6
| 76720 ||  || — || May 4, 2000 || Socorro || LINEAR || — || align=right | 5.2 km || 
|-id=721 bgcolor=#E9E9E9
| 76721 ||  || — || May 7, 2000 || Socorro || LINEAR || — || align=right | 9.1 km || 
|-id=722 bgcolor=#E9E9E9
| 76722 ||  || — || May 7, 2000 || Socorro || LINEAR || — || align=right | 3.4 km || 
|-id=723 bgcolor=#E9E9E9
| 76723 ||  || — || May 7, 2000 || Socorro || LINEAR || — || align=right | 3.6 km || 
|-id=724 bgcolor=#d6d6d6
| 76724 ||  || — || May 7, 2000 || Socorro || LINEAR || — || align=right | 4.4 km || 
|-id=725 bgcolor=#d6d6d6
| 76725 ||  || — || May 7, 2000 || Socorro || LINEAR || EOS || align=right | 4.1 km || 
|-id=726 bgcolor=#d6d6d6
| 76726 ||  || — || May 7, 2000 || Socorro || LINEAR || — || align=right | 5.8 km || 
|-id=727 bgcolor=#d6d6d6
| 76727 ||  || — || May 7, 2000 || Socorro || LINEAR || — || align=right | 6.1 km || 
|-id=728 bgcolor=#d6d6d6
| 76728 ||  || — || May 7, 2000 || Socorro || LINEAR || URS || align=right | 13 km || 
|-id=729 bgcolor=#d6d6d6
| 76729 ||  || — || May 7, 2000 || Socorro || LINEAR || — || align=right | 5.8 km || 
|-id=730 bgcolor=#d6d6d6
| 76730 ||  || — || May 7, 2000 || Socorro || LINEAR || URS || align=right | 14 km || 
|-id=731 bgcolor=#d6d6d6
| 76731 ||  || — || May 7, 2000 || Socorro || LINEAR || EOS || align=right | 5.4 km || 
|-id=732 bgcolor=#E9E9E9
| 76732 ||  || — || May 6, 2000 || Socorro || LINEAR || — || align=right | 3.5 km || 
|-id=733 bgcolor=#d6d6d6
| 76733 ||  || — || May 6, 2000 || Socorro || LINEAR || — || align=right | 4.9 km || 
|-id=734 bgcolor=#d6d6d6
| 76734 ||  || — || May 6, 2000 || Socorro || LINEAR || — || align=right | 5.1 km || 
|-id=735 bgcolor=#d6d6d6
| 76735 ||  || — || May 6, 2000 || Socorro || LINEAR || — || align=right | 7.9 km || 
|-id=736 bgcolor=#d6d6d6
| 76736 ||  || — || May 6, 2000 || Socorro || LINEAR || — || align=right | 4.7 km || 
|-id=737 bgcolor=#E9E9E9
| 76737 ||  || — || May 6, 2000 || Socorro || LINEAR || — || align=right | 4.7 km || 
|-id=738 bgcolor=#d6d6d6
| 76738 ||  || — || May 7, 2000 || Socorro || LINEAR || — || align=right | 4.7 km || 
|-id=739 bgcolor=#d6d6d6
| 76739 ||  || — || May 7, 2000 || Socorro || LINEAR || MEL || align=right | 11 km || 
|-id=740 bgcolor=#E9E9E9
| 76740 ||  || — || May 4, 2000 || Anderson Mesa || LONEOS || DOR || align=right | 5.8 km || 
|-id=741 bgcolor=#d6d6d6
| 76741 ||  || — || May 6, 2000 || Socorro || LINEAR || — || align=right | 4.1 km || 
|-id=742 bgcolor=#d6d6d6
| 76742 ||  || — || May 6, 2000 || Socorro || LINEAR || — || align=right | 7.2 km || 
|-id=743 bgcolor=#E9E9E9
| 76743 ||  || — || May 6, 2000 || Socorro || LINEAR || — || align=right | 7.9 km || 
|-id=744 bgcolor=#E9E9E9
| 76744 ||  || — || May 1, 2000 || Anderson Mesa || LONEOS || ADE || align=right | 7.2 km || 
|-id=745 bgcolor=#d6d6d6
| 76745 ||  || — || May 3, 2000 || Socorro || LINEAR || — || align=right | 6.7 km || 
|-id=746 bgcolor=#E9E9E9
| 76746 ||  || — || May 1, 2000 || Anderson Mesa || LONEOS || — || align=right | 5.0 km || 
|-id=747 bgcolor=#d6d6d6
| 76747 ||  || — || May 2, 2000 || Anderson Mesa || LONEOS || EOS || align=right | 5.8 km || 
|-id=748 bgcolor=#d6d6d6
| 76748 ||  || — || May 2, 2000 || Anderson Mesa || LONEOS || INA || align=right | 11 km || 
|-id=749 bgcolor=#d6d6d6
| 76749 ||  || — || May 2, 2000 || Anderson Mesa || LONEOS || — || align=right | 7.8 km || 
|-id=750 bgcolor=#d6d6d6
| 76750 ||  || — || May 2, 2000 || Kitt Peak || Spacewatch || 3:2 || align=right | 15 km || 
|-id=751 bgcolor=#E9E9E9
| 76751 ||  || — || May 5, 2000 || Socorro || LINEAR || — || align=right | 3.1 km || 
|-id=752 bgcolor=#E9E9E9
| 76752 ||  || — || May 7, 2000 || Anderson Mesa || LONEOS || — || align=right | 4.1 km || 
|-id=753 bgcolor=#d6d6d6
| 76753 ||  || — || May 7, 2000 || Socorro || LINEAR || — || align=right | 6.1 km || 
|-id=754 bgcolor=#d6d6d6
| 76754 ||  || — || May 6, 2000 || Socorro || LINEAR || EOS || align=right | 4.0 km || 
|-id=755 bgcolor=#d6d6d6
| 76755 ||  || — || May 25, 2000 || Kitt Peak || Spacewatch || THM || align=right | 8.0 km || 
|-id=756 bgcolor=#d6d6d6
| 76756 ||  || — || May 26, 2000 || Socorro || LINEAR || EUP || align=right | 11 km || 
|-id=757 bgcolor=#E9E9E9
| 76757 ||  || — || May 27, 2000 || Socorro || LINEAR || 526 || align=right | 4.6 km || 
|-id=758 bgcolor=#d6d6d6
| 76758 ||  || — || May 27, 2000 || Socorro || LINEAR || — || align=right | 4.5 km || 
|-id=759 bgcolor=#d6d6d6
| 76759 ||  || — || May 28, 2000 || Socorro || LINEAR || — || align=right | 7.5 km || 
|-id=760 bgcolor=#d6d6d6
| 76760 ||  || — || May 28, 2000 || Socorro || LINEAR || MEL || align=right | 8.0 km || 
|-id=761 bgcolor=#d6d6d6
| 76761 ||  || — || May 28, 2000 || Socorro || LINEAR || KOR || align=right | 3.0 km || 
|-id=762 bgcolor=#d6d6d6
| 76762 ||  || — || May 28, 2000 || Socorro || LINEAR || THM || align=right | 5.7 km || 
|-id=763 bgcolor=#E9E9E9
| 76763 ||  || — || May 28, 2000 || Socorro || LINEAR || — || align=right | 5.4 km || 
|-id=764 bgcolor=#d6d6d6
| 76764 ||  || — || May 28, 2000 || Socorro || LINEAR || — || align=right | 5.7 km || 
|-id=765 bgcolor=#d6d6d6
| 76765 ||  || — || May 28, 2000 || Socorro || LINEAR || URS || align=right | 8.7 km || 
|-id=766 bgcolor=#d6d6d6
| 76766 ||  || — || May 28, 2000 || Socorro || LINEAR || — || align=right | 6.3 km || 
|-id=767 bgcolor=#d6d6d6
| 76767 ||  || — || May 28, 2000 || Socorro || LINEAR || — || align=right | 7.3 km || 
|-id=768 bgcolor=#E9E9E9
| 76768 ||  || — || May 28, 2000 || Socorro || LINEAR || — || align=right | 3.8 km || 
|-id=769 bgcolor=#E9E9E9
| 76769 ||  || — || May 26, 2000 || Socorro || LINEAR || GAL || align=right | 4.8 km || 
|-id=770 bgcolor=#d6d6d6
| 76770 ||  || — || May 26, 2000 || Črni Vrh || Črni Vrh || — || align=right | 7.9 km || 
|-id=771 bgcolor=#d6d6d6
| 76771 ||  || — || May 27, 2000 || Socorro || LINEAR || — || align=right | 5.8 km || 
|-id=772 bgcolor=#E9E9E9
| 76772 ||  || — || May 28, 2000 || Socorro || LINEAR || — || align=right | 7.5 km || 
|-id=773 bgcolor=#E9E9E9
| 76773 ||  || — || May 26, 2000 || Anderson Mesa || LONEOS || — || align=right | 6.1 km || 
|-id=774 bgcolor=#d6d6d6
| 76774 ||  || — || May 24, 2000 || Anderson Mesa || LONEOS || — || align=right | 5.1 km || 
|-id=775 bgcolor=#d6d6d6
| 76775 ||  || — || May 24, 2000 || Anderson Mesa || LONEOS || — || align=right | 6.1 km || 
|-id=776 bgcolor=#d6d6d6
| 76776 ||  || — || May 24, 2000 || Anderson Mesa || LONEOS || — || align=right | 5.2 km || 
|-id=777 bgcolor=#d6d6d6
| 76777 ||  || — || May 25, 2000 || Anderson Mesa || LONEOS || — || align=right | 6.9 km || 
|-id=778 bgcolor=#d6d6d6
| 76778 ||  || — || May 25, 2000 || Anderson Mesa || LONEOS || — || align=right | 8.9 km || 
|-id=779 bgcolor=#d6d6d6
| 76779 ||  || — || May 26, 2000 || Anderson Mesa || LONEOS || — || align=right | 4.7 km || 
|-id=780 bgcolor=#d6d6d6
| 76780 ||  || — || May 26, 2000 || Anderson Mesa || LONEOS || URS || align=right | 9.3 km || 
|-id=781 bgcolor=#d6d6d6
| 76781 ||  || — || May 27, 2000 || Anderson Mesa || LONEOS || — || align=right | 7.9 km || 
|-id=782 bgcolor=#d6d6d6
| 76782 ||  || — || May 31, 2000 || Anderson Mesa || LONEOS || — || align=right | 5.5 km || 
|-id=783 bgcolor=#d6d6d6
| 76783 ||  || — || May 28, 2000 || Socorro || LINEAR || — || align=right | 5.9 km || 
|-id=784 bgcolor=#E9E9E9
| 76784 ||  || — || May 28, 2000 || Socorro || LINEAR || — || align=right | 3.8 km || 
|-id=785 bgcolor=#d6d6d6
| 76785 ||  || — || May 28, 2000 || Socorro || LINEAR || — || align=right | 8.2 km || 
|-id=786 bgcolor=#d6d6d6
| 76786 ||  || — || June 6, 2000 || Socorro || LINEAR || slow || align=right | 8.3 km || 
|-id=787 bgcolor=#E9E9E9
| 76787 ||  || — || June 5, 2000 || Socorro || LINEAR || — || align=right | 6.1 km || 
|-id=788 bgcolor=#d6d6d6
| 76788 ||  || — || June 6, 2000 || Socorro || LINEAR || TIR || align=right | 5.3 km || 
|-id=789 bgcolor=#FA8072
| 76789 ||  || — || June 8, 2000 || Socorro || LINEAR || H || align=right | 1.9 km || 
|-id=790 bgcolor=#d6d6d6
| 76790 ||  || — || June 8, 2000 || Socorro || LINEAR || — || align=right | 5.4 km || 
|-id=791 bgcolor=#d6d6d6
| 76791 ||  || — || June 1, 2000 || Socorro || LINEAR || ALA || align=right | 12 km || 
|-id=792 bgcolor=#E9E9E9
| 76792 ||  || — || June 1, 2000 || Socorro || LINEAR || — || align=right | 5.3 km || 
|-id=793 bgcolor=#d6d6d6
| 76793 ||  || — || June 5, 2000 || Anderson Mesa || LONEOS || HYG || align=right | 7.5 km || 
|-id=794 bgcolor=#d6d6d6
| 76794 ||  || — || June 5, 2000 || Anderson Mesa || LONEOS || — || align=right | 6.6 km || 
|-id=795 bgcolor=#d6d6d6
| 76795 ||  || — || June 4, 2000 || Socorro || LINEAR || — || align=right | 9.1 km || 
|-id=796 bgcolor=#E9E9E9
| 76796 ||  || — || June 4, 2000 || Socorro || LINEAR || — || align=right | 5.8 km || 
|-id=797 bgcolor=#E9E9E9
| 76797 ||  || — || June 1, 2000 || Haleakala || NEAT || — || align=right | 5.5 km || 
|-id=798 bgcolor=#d6d6d6
| 76798 ||  || — || July 7, 2000 || Socorro || LINEAR || — || align=right | 9.9 km || 
|-id=799 bgcolor=#d6d6d6
| 76799 ||  || — || July 30, 2000 || Socorro || LINEAR || — || align=right | 5.3 km || 
|-id=800 bgcolor=#fefefe
| 76800 ||  || — || July 31, 2000 || Socorro || LINEAR || Hslow || align=right | 3.1 km || 
|}

76801–76900 

|-bgcolor=#d6d6d6
| 76801 ||  || — || August 2, 2000 || Socorro || LINEAR || — || align=right | 18 km || 
|-id=802 bgcolor=#fefefe
| 76802 ||  || — || August 9, 2000 || Socorro || LINEAR || H || align=right | 1.8 km || 
|-id=803 bgcolor=#C2E0FF
| 76803 ||  || — || August 5, 2000 || Mauna Kea || M. J. Holman || other TNO || align=right | 154 km || 
|-id=804 bgcolor=#C2FFFF
| 76804 || 2000 QE || — || August 20, 2000 || Anderson Mesa || LONEOS || L5 || align=right | 17 km || 
|-id=805 bgcolor=#d6d6d6
| 76805 ||  || — || August 24, 2000 || Socorro || LINEAR || 3:2 || align=right | 10 km || 
|-id=806 bgcolor=#d6d6d6
| 76806 ||  || — || August 25, 2000 || Socorro || LINEAR || EOS || align=right | 5.9 km || 
|-id=807 bgcolor=#fefefe
| 76807 ||  || — || August 26, 2000 || Socorro || LINEAR || H || align=right | 1.6 km || 
|-id=808 bgcolor=#fefefe
| 76808 ||  || — || August 28, 2000 || Socorro || LINEAR || H || align=right | 2.0 km || 
|-id=809 bgcolor=#C2FFFF
| 76809 ||  || — || August 24, 2000 || Socorro || LINEAR || L5 || align=right | 18 km || 
|-id=810 bgcolor=#d6d6d6
| 76810 ||  || — || August 24, 2000 || Socorro || LINEAR || HIL3:2 || align=right | 13 km || 
|-id=811 bgcolor=#d6d6d6
| 76811 ||  || — || August 26, 2000 || Socorro || LINEAR || 3:2 || align=right | 12 km || 
|-id=812 bgcolor=#C2FFFF
| 76812 ||  || — || August 25, 2000 || Socorro || LINEAR || L5 || align=right | 23 km || 
|-id=813 bgcolor=#d6d6d6
| 76813 ||  || — || August 31, 2000 || Socorro || LINEAR || THB || align=right | 8.7 km || 
|-id=814 bgcolor=#d6d6d6
| 76814 ||  || — || August 31, 2000 || Socorro || LINEAR || FIR || align=right | 7.6 km || 
|-id=815 bgcolor=#fefefe
| 76815 ||  || — || August 31, 2000 || Socorro || LINEAR || H || align=right | 1.6 km || 
|-id=816 bgcolor=#fefefe
| 76816 ||  || — || September 3, 2000 || Socorro || LINEAR || H || align=right | 1.6 km || 
|-id=817 bgcolor=#d6d6d6
| 76817 ||  || — || September 3, 2000 || Socorro || LINEAR || EOS || align=right | 6.5 km || 
|-id=818 bgcolor=#fefefe
| 76818 Brianenke ||  ||  || September 8, 2000 || Socorro || LINEAR || Hmoon || align=right | 3.8 km || 
|-id=819 bgcolor=#C2FFFF
| 76819 ||  || — || September 3, 2000 || Socorro || LINEAR || L5 || align=right | 20 km || 
|-id=820 bgcolor=#C2FFFF
| 76820 ||  || — || September 4, 2000 || Anderson Mesa || LONEOS || L5 || align=right | 17 km || 
|-id=821 bgcolor=#fefefe
| 76821 ||  || — || September 21, 2000 || Socorro || LINEAR || H || align=right | 1.3 km || 
|-id=822 bgcolor=#d6d6d6
| 76822 ||  || — || September 23, 2000 || Socorro || LINEAR || 3:2 || align=right | 12 km || 
|-id=823 bgcolor=#fefefe
| 76823 ||  || — || September 24, 2000 || Socorro || LINEAR || — || align=right | 1.4 km || 
|-id=824 bgcolor=#C2FFFF
| 76824 ||  || — || September 25, 2000 || Socorro || LINEAR || L5 || align=right | 15 km || 
|-id=825 bgcolor=#fefefe
| 76825 ||  || — || September 24, 2000 || Socorro || LINEAR || V || align=right | 1.9 km || 
|-id=826 bgcolor=#C2FFFF
| 76826 ||  || — || September 22, 2000 || Socorro || LINEAR || L5010 || align=right | 21 km || 
|-id=827 bgcolor=#fefefe
| 76827 ||  || — || September 27, 2000 || Socorro || LINEAR || H || align=right | 1.4 km || 
|-id=828 bgcolor=#FA8072
| 76828 ||  || — || September 28, 2000 || Socorro || LINEAR || — || align=right | 1.6 km || 
|-id=829 bgcolor=#fefefe
| 76829 ||  || — || September 23, 2000 || Socorro || LINEAR || — || align=right | 1.9 km || 
|-id=830 bgcolor=#C2FFFF
| 76830 ||  || — || September 19, 2000 || Kvistaberg || UDAS || L5 || align=right | 23 km || 
|-id=831 bgcolor=#d6d6d6
| 76831 ||  || — || September 27, 2000 || Socorro || LINEAR || HIL3:2 || align=right | 13 km || 
|-id=832 bgcolor=#fefefe
| 76832 ||  || — || September 27, 2000 || Socorro || LINEAR || H || align=right | 1.5 km || 
|-id=833 bgcolor=#fefefe
| 76833 ||  || — || September 28, 2000 || Socorro || LINEAR || H || align=right | 1.3 km || 
|-id=834 bgcolor=#C2FFFF
| 76834 ||  || — || September 24, 2000 || Socorro || LINEAR || L5 || align=right | 16 km || 
|-id=835 bgcolor=#C2FFFF
| 76835 ||  || — || September 24, 2000 || Socorro || LINEAR || L5 || align=right | 14 km || 
|-id=836 bgcolor=#C2FFFF
| 76836 ||  || — || September 26, 2000 || Socorro || LINEAR || L5 || align=right | 18 km || 
|-id=837 bgcolor=#C2FFFF
| 76837 ||  || — || September 30, 2000 || Socorro || LINEAR || L5 || align=right | 20 km || 
|-id=838 bgcolor=#C2FFFF
| 76838 ||  || — || September 22, 2000 || Socorro || LINEAR || L5 || align=right | 17 km || 
|-id=839 bgcolor=#fefefe
| 76839 ||  || — || September 29, 2000 || Anderson Mesa || LONEOS || H || align=right | 1.4 km || 
|-id=840 bgcolor=#C2FFFF
| 76840 ||  || — || October 1, 2000 || Socorro || LINEAR || L5 || align=right | 12 km || 
|-id=841 bgcolor=#fefefe
| 76841 ||  || — || October 4, 2000 || Socorro || LINEAR || H || align=right | 1.7 km || 
|-id=842 bgcolor=#fefefe
| 76842 ||  || — || October 4, 2000 || Socorro || LINEAR || H || align=right | 2.1 km || 
|-id=843 bgcolor=#fefefe
| 76843 ||  || — || October 1, 2000 || Socorro || LINEAR || H || align=right | 1.8 km || 
|-id=844 bgcolor=#fefefe
| 76844 ||  || — || October 24, 2000 || Socorro || LINEAR || FLO || align=right | 1.6 km || 
|-id=845 bgcolor=#fefefe
| 76845 ||  || — || November 1, 2000 || Socorro || LINEAR || PHO || align=right | 2.5 km || 
|-id=846 bgcolor=#fefefe
| 76846 ||  || — || November 1, 2000 || Socorro || LINEAR || — || align=right | 2.6 km || 
|-id=847 bgcolor=#fefefe
| 76847 ||  || — || November 1, 2000 || Socorro || LINEAR || — || align=right | 1.6 km || 
|-id=848 bgcolor=#fefefe
| 76848 ||  || — || November 17, 2000 || Socorro || LINEAR || H || align=right | 1.5 km || 
|-id=849 bgcolor=#fefefe
| 76849 ||  || — || November 20, 2000 || Farpoint || Farpoint Obs. || — || align=right | 1.4 km || 
|-id=850 bgcolor=#fefefe
| 76850 ||  || — || November 21, 2000 || Socorro || LINEAR || — || align=right | 1.6 km || 
|-id=851 bgcolor=#fefefe
| 76851 ||  || — || November 21, 2000 || Socorro || LINEAR || — || align=right | 1.6 km || 
|-id=852 bgcolor=#fefefe
| 76852 ||  || — || November 24, 2000 || Kitt Peak || Spacewatch || V || align=right | 1.2 km || 
|-id=853 bgcolor=#fefefe
| 76853 ||  || — || November 20, 2000 || Socorro || LINEAR || — || align=right | 7.3 km || 
|-id=854 bgcolor=#fefefe
| 76854 ||  || — || November 25, 2000 || Socorro || LINEAR || PHO || align=right | 2.7 km || 
|-id=855 bgcolor=#fefefe
| 76855 ||  || — || November 28, 2000 || Fountain Hills || C. W. Juels || PHO || align=right | 3.3 km || 
|-id=856 bgcolor=#fefefe
| 76856 ||  || — || November 21, 2000 || Socorro || LINEAR || — || align=right | 2.2 km || 
|-id=857 bgcolor=#C2FFFF
| 76857 ||  || — || November 18, 2000 || Socorro || LINEAR || L5 || align=right | 33 km || 
|-id=858 bgcolor=#fefefe
| 76858 ||  || — || November 19, 2000 || Socorro || LINEAR || H || align=right | 1.5 km || 
|-id=859 bgcolor=#fefefe
| 76859 ||  || — || November 22, 2000 || Haleakala || NEAT || H || align=right | 1.8 km || 
|-id=860 bgcolor=#fefefe
| 76860 ||  || — || November 28, 2000 || Kitt Peak || Spacewatch || FLO || align=right | 1.9 km || 
|-id=861 bgcolor=#fefefe
| 76861 ||  || — || November 28, 2000 || Anderson Mesa || LONEOS || H || align=right | 1.9 km || 
|-id=862 bgcolor=#fefefe
| 76862 ||  || — || December 1, 2000 || Socorro || LINEAR || — || align=right | 3.0 km || 
|-id=863 bgcolor=#fefefe
| 76863 ||  || — || December 4, 2000 || Socorro || LINEAR || — || align=right | 4.2 km || 
|-id=864 bgcolor=#fefefe
| 76864 ||  || — || December 4, 2000 || Socorro || LINEAR || H || align=right | 3.2 km || 
|-id=865 bgcolor=#fefefe
| 76865 ||  || — || December 5, 2000 || Socorro || LINEAR || H || align=right | 2.7 km || 
|-id=866 bgcolor=#fefefe
| 76866 ||  || — || December 4, 2000 || Socorro || LINEAR || PHO || align=right | 3.8 km || 
|-id=867 bgcolor=#C2FFFF
| 76867 ||  || — || December 19, 2000 || Haleakala || NEAT || L5ENM || align=right | 43 km || 
|-id=868 bgcolor=#fefefe
| 76868 ||  || — || December 22, 2000 || Socorro || LINEAR || — || align=right | 2.2 km || 
|-id=869 bgcolor=#fefefe
| 76869 ||  || — || December 27, 2000 || Desert Beaver || W. K. Y. Yeung || — || align=right | 1.7 km || 
|-id=870 bgcolor=#fefefe
| 76870 ||  || — || December 22, 2000 || Anderson Mesa || LONEOS || NYS || align=right | 1.5 km || 
|-id=871 bgcolor=#fefefe
| 76871 ||  || — || December 29, 2000 || Haleakala || NEAT || FLO || align=right | 1.5 km || 
|-id=872 bgcolor=#fefefe
| 76872 ||  || — || December 29, 2000 || Haleakala || NEAT || — || align=right | 1.4 km || 
|-id=873 bgcolor=#fefefe
| 76873 ||  || — || December 30, 2000 || Socorro || LINEAR || H || align=right | 1.5 km || 
|-id=874 bgcolor=#fefefe
| 76874 ||  || — || December 30, 2000 || Socorro || LINEAR || — || align=right | 1.6 km || 
|-id=875 bgcolor=#fefefe
| 76875 ||  || — || December 30, 2000 || Socorro || LINEAR || — || align=right | 2.7 km || 
|-id=876 bgcolor=#fefefe
| 76876 ||  || — || December 30, 2000 || Socorro || LINEAR || — || align=right | 3.6 km || 
|-id=877 bgcolor=#fefefe
| 76877 ||  || — || December 30, 2000 || Socorro || LINEAR || — || align=right | 1.6 km || 
|-id=878 bgcolor=#fefefe
| 76878 ||  || — || December 30, 2000 || Socorro || LINEAR || — || align=right | 1.9 km || 
|-id=879 bgcolor=#fefefe
| 76879 ||  || — || December 30, 2000 || Socorro || LINEAR || — || align=right | 1.6 km || 
|-id=880 bgcolor=#fefefe
| 76880 ||  || — || December 30, 2000 || Socorro || LINEAR || — || align=right | 1.9 km || 
|-id=881 bgcolor=#fefefe
| 76881 ||  || — || December 30, 2000 || Socorro || LINEAR || FLO || align=right | 1.5 km || 
|-id=882 bgcolor=#fefefe
| 76882 ||  || — || December 30, 2000 || Socorro || LINEAR || — || align=right | 2.4 km || 
|-id=883 bgcolor=#fefefe
| 76883 ||  || — || December 30, 2000 || Socorro || LINEAR || — || align=right | 1.6 km || 
|-id=884 bgcolor=#fefefe
| 76884 ||  || — || December 30, 2000 || Socorro || LINEAR || — || align=right | 2.5 km || 
|-id=885 bgcolor=#fefefe
| 76885 ||  || — || December 30, 2000 || Socorro || LINEAR || — || align=right | 1.8 km || 
|-id=886 bgcolor=#fefefe
| 76886 ||  || — || December 30, 2000 || Socorro || LINEAR || — || align=right | 1.6 km || 
|-id=887 bgcolor=#fefefe
| 76887 ||  || — || December 30, 2000 || Socorro || LINEAR || — || align=right | 1.8 km || 
|-id=888 bgcolor=#fefefe
| 76888 ||  || — || December 30, 2000 || Socorro || LINEAR || — || align=right | 2.1 km || 
|-id=889 bgcolor=#fefefe
| 76889 ||  || — || December 30, 2000 || Socorro || LINEAR || — || align=right | 1.8 km || 
|-id=890 bgcolor=#fefefe
| 76890 ||  || — || December 30, 2000 || Socorro || LINEAR || — || align=right | 1.6 km || 
|-id=891 bgcolor=#fefefe
| 76891 ||  || — || December 30, 2000 || Socorro || LINEAR || — || align=right | 1.8 km || 
|-id=892 bgcolor=#fefefe
| 76892 ||  || — || December 30, 2000 || Socorro || LINEAR || V || align=right | 1.8 km || 
|-id=893 bgcolor=#E9E9E9
| 76893 ||  || — || December 30, 2000 || Socorro || LINEAR || — || align=right | 4.1 km || 
|-id=894 bgcolor=#fefefe
| 76894 ||  || — || December 30, 2000 || Socorro || LINEAR || — || align=right | 1.7 km || 
|-id=895 bgcolor=#fefefe
| 76895 ||  || — || December 28, 2000 || Socorro || LINEAR || FLO || align=right | 1.7 km || 
|-id=896 bgcolor=#fefefe
| 76896 ||  || — || December 28, 2000 || Socorro || LINEAR || — || align=right | 2.4 km || 
|-id=897 bgcolor=#fefefe
| 76897 ||  || — || December 28, 2000 || Socorro || LINEAR || — || align=right | 1.9 km || 
|-id=898 bgcolor=#fefefe
| 76898 ||  || — || December 28, 2000 || Socorro || LINEAR || V || align=right | 2.0 km || 
|-id=899 bgcolor=#fefefe
| 76899 ||  || — || December 28, 2000 || Socorro || LINEAR || — || align=right | 2.0 km || 
|-id=900 bgcolor=#fefefe
| 76900 ||  || — || December 30, 2000 || Socorro || LINEAR || — || align=right | 4.3 km || 
|}

76901–77000 

|-bgcolor=#fefefe
| 76901 ||  || — || December 30, 2000 || Socorro || LINEAR || NYS || align=right | 1.4 km || 
|-id=902 bgcolor=#fefefe
| 76902 ||  || — || December 30, 2000 || Socorro || LINEAR || FLO || align=right | 1.2 km || 
|-id=903 bgcolor=#fefefe
| 76903 ||  || — || December 30, 2000 || Socorro || LINEAR || — || align=right | 2.1 km || 
|-id=904 bgcolor=#fefefe
| 76904 ||  || — || December 30, 2000 || Socorro || LINEAR || — || align=right | 1.6 km || 
|-id=905 bgcolor=#fefefe
| 76905 ||  || — || December 30, 2000 || Socorro || LINEAR || CIM || align=right | 5.8 km || 
|-id=906 bgcolor=#fefefe
| 76906 ||  || — || December 19, 2000 || Anderson Mesa || LONEOS || H || align=right | 1.4 km || 
|-id=907 bgcolor=#E9E9E9
| 76907 ||  || — || December 28, 2000 || Socorro || LINEAR || — || align=right | 3.2 km || 
|-id=908 bgcolor=#E9E9E9
| 76908 ||  || — || December 29, 2000 || Anderson Mesa || LONEOS || — || align=right | 5.8 km || 
|-id=909 bgcolor=#fefefe
| 76909 ||  || — || December 29, 2000 || Haleakala || NEAT || NYS || align=right | 1.7 km || 
|-id=910 bgcolor=#fefefe
| 76910 ||  || — || December 29, 2000 || Haleakala || NEAT || — || align=right | 1.7 km || 
|-id=911 bgcolor=#fefefe
| 76911 ||  || — || December 30, 2000 || Anderson Mesa || LONEOS || — || align=right | 2.4 km || 
|-id=912 bgcolor=#fefefe
| 76912 ||  || — || December 22, 2000 || Anderson Mesa || LONEOS || — || align=right | 2.3 km || 
|-id=913 bgcolor=#fefefe
| 76913 ||  || — || December 26, 2000 || Kitt Peak || Spacewatch || NYS || align=right | 1.4 km || 
|-id=914 bgcolor=#fefefe
| 76914 ||  || — || December 26, 2000 || Kitt Peak || Spacewatch || NYS || align=right | 1.8 km || 
|-id=915 bgcolor=#fefefe
| 76915 ||  || — || December 27, 2000 || Haleakala || NEAT || H || align=right | 1.5 km || 
|-id=916 bgcolor=#fefefe
| 76916 || 2001 AB || — || January 1, 2001 || Kitt Peak || Spacewatch || — || align=right | 1.6 km || 
|-id=917 bgcolor=#fefefe
| 76917 ||  || — || January 2, 2001 || Socorro || LINEAR || V || align=right | 1.6 km || 
|-id=918 bgcolor=#fefefe
| 76918 ||  || — || January 2, 2001 || Socorro || LINEAR || — || align=right | 1.9 km || 
|-id=919 bgcolor=#fefefe
| 76919 ||  || — || January 2, 2001 || Socorro || LINEAR || — || align=right | 2.5 km || 
|-id=920 bgcolor=#fefefe
| 76920 ||  || — || January 2, 2001 || Socorro || LINEAR || V || align=right | 1.7 km || 
|-id=921 bgcolor=#fefefe
| 76921 ||  || — || January 2, 2001 || Socorro || LINEAR || — || align=right | 1.8 km || 
|-id=922 bgcolor=#fefefe
| 76922 ||  || — || January 2, 2001 || Socorro || LINEAR || ERI || align=right | 3.9 km || 
|-id=923 bgcolor=#E9E9E9
| 76923 ||  || — || January 2, 2001 || Socorro || LINEAR || — || align=right | 7.9 km || 
|-id=924 bgcolor=#fefefe
| 76924 ||  || — || January 3, 2001 || Socorro || LINEAR || — || align=right | 1.9 km || 
|-id=925 bgcolor=#fefefe
| 76925 ||  || — || January 3, 2001 || Socorro || LINEAR || — || align=right | 1.7 km || 
|-id=926 bgcolor=#fefefe
| 76926 ||  || — || January 3, 2001 || Socorro || LINEAR || PHO || align=right | 2.5 km || 
|-id=927 bgcolor=#fefefe
| 76927 ||  || — || January 4, 2001 || Socorro || LINEAR || — || align=right | 2.3 km || 
|-id=928 bgcolor=#fefefe
| 76928 ||  || — || January 5, 2001 || Socorro || LINEAR || H || align=right | 1.9 km || 
|-id=929 bgcolor=#fefefe
| 76929 ||  || — || January 4, 2001 || Socorro || LINEAR || H || align=right | 2.1 km || 
|-id=930 bgcolor=#fefefe
| 76930 ||  || — || January 2, 2001 || Kitt Peak || Spacewatch || — || align=right | 2.0 km || 
|-id=931 bgcolor=#fefefe
| 76931 ||  || — || January 3, 2001 || Anderson Mesa || LONEOS || — || align=right | 1.9 km || 
|-id=932 bgcolor=#fefefe
| 76932 ||  || — || January 4, 2001 || Anderson Mesa || LONEOS || — || align=right | 1.9 km || 
|-id=933 bgcolor=#fefefe
| 76933 ||  || — || January 6, 2001 || Socorro || LINEAR || — || align=right | 1.8 km || 
|-id=934 bgcolor=#fefefe
| 76934 ||  || — || January 15, 2001 || Oizumi || T. Kobayashi || FLO || align=right | 1.6 km || 
|-id=935 bgcolor=#fefefe
| 76935 ||  || — || January 15, 2001 || Oizumi || T. Kobayashi || — || align=right | 1.8 km || 
|-id=936 bgcolor=#fefefe
| 76936 ||  || — || January 15, 2001 || Socorro || LINEAR || — || align=right | 2.0 km || 
|-id=937 bgcolor=#fefefe
| 76937 ||  || — || January 17, 2001 || Oizumi || T. Kobayashi || FLO || align=right | 1.6 km || 
|-id=938 bgcolor=#fefefe
| 76938 ||  || — || January 17, 2001 || Kitt Peak || Spacewatch || — || align=right | 1.3 km || 
|-id=939 bgcolor=#E9E9E9
| 76939 ||  || — || January 17, 2001 || Socorro || LINEAR || — || align=right | 7.0 km || 
|-id=940 bgcolor=#fefefe
| 76940 ||  || — || January 18, 2001 || Socorro || LINEAR || — || align=right | 1.3 km || 
|-id=941 bgcolor=#fefefe
| 76941 ||  || — || January 18, 2001 || Socorro || LINEAR || V || align=right | 1.7 km || 
|-id=942 bgcolor=#fefefe
| 76942 ||  || — || January 21, 2001 || Socorro || LINEAR || — || align=right | 1.7 km || 
|-id=943 bgcolor=#E9E9E9
| 76943 ||  || — || January 21, 2001 || Oizumi || T. Kobayashi || — || align=right | 2.1 km || 
|-id=944 bgcolor=#fefefe
| 76944 ||  || — || January 21, 2001 || Oizumi || T. Kobayashi || — || align=right | 2.1 km || 
|-id=945 bgcolor=#E9E9E9
| 76945 ||  || — || January 19, 2001 || Socorro || LINEAR || — || align=right | 3.2 km || 
|-id=946 bgcolor=#fefefe
| 76946 ||  || — || January 19, 2001 || Socorro || LINEAR || NYS || align=right | 1.6 km || 
|-id=947 bgcolor=#fefefe
| 76947 ||  || — || January 19, 2001 || Socorro || LINEAR || NYS || align=right | 1.4 km || 
|-id=948 bgcolor=#fefefe
| 76948 ||  || — || January 19, 2001 || Socorro || LINEAR || — || align=right | 1.9 km || 
|-id=949 bgcolor=#fefefe
| 76949 ||  || — || January 19, 2001 || Socorro || LINEAR || — || align=right | 1.7 km || 
|-id=950 bgcolor=#fefefe
| 76950 ||  || — || January 20, 2001 || Socorro || LINEAR || V || align=right | 1.5 km || 
|-id=951 bgcolor=#fefefe
| 76951 ||  || — || January 20, 2001 || Socorro || LINEAR || — || align=right | 2.7 km || 
|-id=952 bgcolor=#fefefe
| 76952 ||  || — || January 20, 2001 || Socorro || LINEAR || NYS || align=right | 1.8 km || 
|-id=953 bgcolor=#fefefe
| 76953 ||  || — || January 20, 2001 || Socorro || LINEAR || — || align=right | 2.0 km || 
|-id=954 bgcolor=#fefefe
| 76954 ||  || — || January 20, 2001 || Socorro || LINEAR || — || align=right | 2.2 km || 
|-id=955 bgcolor=#fefefe
| 76955 ||  || — || January 20, 2001 || Socorro || LINEAR || — || align=right | 2.0 km || 
|-id=956 bgcolor=#fefefe
| 76956 ||  || — || January 20, 2001 || Socorro || LINEAR || — || align=right | 2.1 km || 
|-id=957 bgcolor=#fefefe
| 76957 ||  || — || January 20, 2001 || Socorro || LINEAR || NYS || align=right | 1.7 km || 
|-id=958 bgcolor=#E9E9E9
| 76958 ||  || — || January 20, 2001 || Socorro || LINEAR || RAF || align=right | 2.3 km || 
|-id=959 bgcolor=#fefefe
| 76959 ||  || — || January 20, 2001 || Socorro || LINEAR || NYS || align=right | 1.8 km || 
|-id=960 bgcolor=#fefefe
| 76960 ||  || — || January 20, 2001 || Socorro || LINEAR || — || align=right | 2.2 km || 
|-id=961 bgcolor=#fefefe
| 76961 ||  || — || January 20, 2001 || Socorro || LINEAR || — || align=right | 1.2 km || 
|-id=962 bgcolor=#fefefe
| 76962 ||  || — || January 20, 2001 || Socorro || LINEAR || V || align=right | 1.3 km || 
|-id=963 bgcolor=#fefefe
| 76963 ||  || — || January 18, 2001 || Socorro || LINEAR || — || align=right | 1.4 km || 
|-id=964 bgcolor=#E9E9E9
| 76964 ||  || — || January 19, 2001 || Kitt Peak || Spacewatch || — || align=right | 2.1 km || 
|-id=965 bgcolor=#fefefe
| 76965 ||  || — || January 20, 2001 || Socorro || LINEAR || — || align=right | 2.0 km || 
|-id=966 bgcolor=#fefefe
| 76966 ||  || — || January 21, 2001 || Socorro || LINEAR || — || align=right | 1.3 km || 
|-id=967 bgcolor=#E9E9E9
| 76967 ||  || — || January 21, 2001 || Socorro || LINEAR || — || align=right | 1.9 km || 
|-id=968 bgcolor=#fefefe
| 76968 ||  || — || January 21, 2001 || Socorro || LINEAR || FLO || align=right | 1.6 km || 
|-id=969 bgcolor=#fefefe
| 76969 ||  || — || January 21, 2001 || Socorro || LINEAR || NYS || align=right | 1.6 km || 
|-id=970 bgcolor=#fefefe
| 76970 ||  || — || January 28, 2001 || Oizumi || T. Kobayashi || V || align=right | 1.5 km || 
|-id=971 bgcolor=#E9E9E9
| 76971 ||  || — || January 28, 2001 || Oizumi || T. Kobayashi || — || align=right | 3.2 km || 
|-id=972 bgcolor=#fefefe
| 76972 ||  || — || January 16, 2001 || Kitt Peak || Spacewatch || — || align=right | 2.9 km || 
|-id=973 bgcolor=#fefefe
| 76973 ||  || — || January 17, 2001 || Haleakala || NEAT || — || align=right | 3.4 km || 
|-id=974 bgcolor=#fefefe
| 76974 ||  || — || January 18, 2001 || Kitt Peak || Spacewatch || V || align=right | 1.6 km || 
|-id=975 bgcolor=#E9E9E9
| 76975 ||  || — || January 19, 2001 || Socorro || LINEAR || MAR || align=right | 2.9 km || 
|-id=976 bgcolor=#fefefe
| 76976 ||  || — || January 21, 2001 || Socorro || LINEAR || — || align=right | 1.7 km || 
|-id=977 bgcolor=#fefefe
| 76977 ||  || — || January 26, 2001 || Socorro || LINEAR || — || align=right | 2.1 km || 
|-id=978 bgcolor=#FA8072
| 76978 ||  || — || January 29, 2001 || Socorro || LINEAR || — || align=right | 3.1 km || 
|-id=979 bgcolor=#E9E9E9
| 76979 ||  || — || January 31, 2001 || Desert Beaver || W. K. Y. Yeung || EUN || align=right | 2.9 km || 
|-id=980 bgcolor=#fefefe
| 76980 ||  || — || January 29, 2001 || Socorro || LINEAR || — || align=right | 1.8 km || 
|-id=981 bgcolor=#fefefe
| 76981 ||  || — || January 26, 2001 || Socorro || LINEAR || V || align=right | 1.7 km || 
|-id=982 bgcolor=#fefefe
| 76982 ||  || — || January 26, 2001 || Socorro || LINEAR || FLO || align=right | 1.4 km || 
|-id=983 bgcolor=#E9E9E9
| 76983 ||  || — || January 26, 2001 || Socorro || LINEAR || MAR || align=right | 3.7 km || 
|-id=984 bgcolor=#fefefe
| 76984 ||  || — || January 29, 2001 || Socorro || LINEAR || — || align=right | 2.0 km || 
|-id=985 bgcolor=#fefefe
| 76985 ||  || — || January 31, 2001 || Socorro || LINEAR || NYS || align=right | 1.6 km || 
|-id=986 bgcolor=#fefefe
| 76986 ||  || — || January 31, 2001 || Socorro || LINEAR || NYS || align=right | 1.7 km || 
|-id=987 bgcolor=#fefefe
| 76987 ||  || — || January 31, 2001 || Socorro || LINEAR || NYS || align=right | 1.6 km || 
|-id=988 bgcolor=#fefefe
| 76988 ||  || — || January 31, 2001 || Socorro || LINEAR || — || align=right | 1.4 km || 
|-id=989 bgcolor=#fefefe
| 76989 ||  || — || January 31, 2001 || Socorro || LINEAR || NYS || align=right | 1.3 km || 
|-id=990 bgcolor=#fefefe
| 76990 ||  || — || January 30, 2001 || Socorro || LINEAR || PHO || align=right | 2.8 km || 
|-id=991 bgcolor=#E9E9E9
| 76991 ||  || — || January 31, 2001 || Socorro || LINEAR || — || align=right | 7.5 km || 
|-id=992 bgcolor=#E9E9E9
| 76992 ||  || — || January 27, 2001 || Haleakala || NEAT || — || align=right | 2.9 km || 
|-id=993 bgcolor=#E9E9E9
| 76993 ||  || — || January 27, 2001 || Haleakala || NEAT || — || align=right | 4.6 km || 
|-id=994 bgcolor=#fefefe
| 76994 ||  || — || January 29, 2001 || Kvistaberg || UDAS || FLO || align=right | 1.4 km || 
|-id=995 bgcolor=#fefefe
| 76995 ||  || — || January 26, 2001 || Kitt Peak || Spacewatch || — || align=right | 2.4 km || 
|-id=996 bgcolor=#fefefe
| 76996 ||  || — || January 26, 2001 || Socorro || LINEAR || — || align=right | 2.6 km || 
|-id=997 bgcolor=#fefefe
| 76997 ||  || — || January 21, 2001 || Socorro || LINEAR || — || align=right | 4.1 km || 
|-id=998 bgcolor=#fefefe
| 76998 ||  || — || January 18, 2001 || Socorro || LINEAR || V || align=right | 2.0 km || 
|-id=999 bgcolor=#fefefe
| 76999 ||  || — || February 1, 2001 || Socorro || LINEAR || — || align=right | 1.6 km || 
|-id=000 bgcolor=#fefefe
| 77000 ||  || — || February 1, 2001 || Socorro || LINEAR || — || align=right | 1.7 km || 
|}

References

External links 
 Discovery Circumstances: Numbered Minor Planets (75001)–(80000) (IAU Minor Planet Center)

0076